= List of municipalities of the Province of Verona =

The following is a list of the 98 municipalities (comuni) of the Province of Verona in the region of Veneto in Italy.

== List ==
| Municipality | Population (2026) | Area (km²) | Density |
|---|---|---|---|
| Affi | 2,504 | 9.88 | 253.4 |
| Albaredo d'Adige | 5,298 | 28.25 | 187.5 |
| Angiari | 2,544 | 13.47 | 188.9 |
| Arcole | 6,419 | 18.87 | 340.2 |
| Badia Calavena | 2,707 | 26.94 | 100.5 |
| Bardolino | 6,816 | 57.33 | 118.9 |
| Belfiore | 3,408 | 26.45 | 128.8 |
| Bevilacqua | 1,817 | 12.20 | 148.9 |
| Bonavigo | 1,990 | 17.99 | 110.6 |
| Boschi Sant'Anna | 1,385 | 8.97 | 154.4 |
| Bosco Chiesanuova | 3,593 | 64.81 | 55.4 |
| Bovolone | 16,392 | 41.27 | 397.2 |
| Brentino Belluno | 1,368 | 25.99 | 52.6 |
| Brenzone | 2,436 | 51.59 | 47.2 |
| Bussolengo | 21,037 | 24.23 | 868.2 |
| Buttapietra | 7,031 | 17.27 | 407.1 |
| Caldiero | 8,160 | 10.37 | 786.9 |
| Caprino Veronese | 8,775 | 47.32 | 185.4 |
| Casaleone | 5,672 | 38.61 | 146.9 |
| Castagnaro | 3,497 | 34.80 | 100.5 |
| Castel d'Azzano | 12,333 | 9.72 | 1,268.8 |
| Castelnuovo del Garda | 13,306 | 34.43 | 386.5 |
| Cavaion Veronese | 5,995 | 12.91 | 464.4 |
| Cazzano di Tramigna | 1,466 | 12.27 | 119.5 |
| Cerea | 17,304 | 70.30 | 246.1 |
| Cerro Veronese | 2,698 | 10.06 | 268.2 |
| Cologna Veneta | 8,543 | 42.83 | 199.5 |
| Colognola ai Colli | 8,801 | 20.90 | 421.1 |
| Concamarise | 1,060 | 7.91 | 134.0 |
| Costermano | 3,996 | 16.74 | 238.7 |
| Dolcè | 2,536 | 30.95 | 81.9 |
| Erbè | 1,922 | 16.10 | 119.4 |
| Erbezzo | 850 | 31.97 | 26.6 |
| Ferrara di Monte Baldo | 302 | 26.89 | 11.2 |
| Fumane | 4,193 | 34.21 | 122.6 |
| Garda | 4,044 | 14.37 | 281.4 |
| Gazzo Veronese | 5,226 | 56.66 | 92.2 |
| Grezzana | 10,775 | 49.49 | 217.7 |
| Illasi | 5,149 | 25.00 | 206.0 |
| Isola della Scala | 11,825 | 69.83 | 169.3 |
| Isola Rizza | 3,317 | 16.68 | 198.9 |
| Lavagno | 8,730 | 14.64 | 596.3 |
| Lazise | 6,771 | 63.15 | 107.2 |
| Legnago | 26,084 | 79.27 | 329.1 |
| Malcesine | 3,472 | 69.29 | 50.1 |
| Marano di Valpolicella | 3,085 | 18.62 | 165.7 |
| Mezzane di Sotto | 2,502 | 19.71 | 126.9 |
| Minerbe | 4,644 | 29.65 | 156.6 |
| Montecchia di Crosara | 4,323 | 21.06 | 205.3 |
| Monteforte d'Alpone | 8,953 | 20.47 | 437.4 |
| Mozzecane | 8,200 | 24.85 | 330.0 |
| Negrar | 16,378 | 40.42 | 405.2 |
| Nogara | 8,488 | 38.78 | 218.9 |
| Nogarole Rocca | 3,888 | 29.14 | 133.4 |
| Oppeano | 10,383 | 46.73 | 222.2 |
| Palù | 1,196 | 13.61 | 87.9 |
| Pastrengo | 3,089 | 9.00 | 343.2 |
| Pescantina | 17,630 | 19.73 | 893.6 |
| Peschiera del Garda | 10,905 | 18.27 | 596.9 |
| Povegliano Veronese | 7,401 | 18.53 | 399.4 |
| Pressana | 2,511 | 17.39 | 144.4 |
| Rivoli Veronese | 2,368 | 18.43 | 128.5 |
| Roncà | 3,755 | 18.15 | 206.9 |
| Ronco all'Adige | 6,195 | 42.82 | 144.7 |
| Roverchiara | 2,596 | 19.65 | 132.1 |
| Roverè Veronese | 2,169 | 36.55 | 59.3 |
| Roveredo di Guà | 1,657 | 10.16 | 163.1 |
| Salizzole | 3,758 | 30.70 | 122.4 |
| San Bonifacio | 21,399 | 33.79 | 633.3 |
| San Giovanni Ilarione | 4,848 | 25.40 | 190.9 |
| San Giovanni Lupatoto | 25,427 | 19.01 | 1,337.6 |
| San Martino Buon Albergo | 16,797 | 34.75 | 483.4 |
| San Mauro di Saline | 606 | 11.24 | 53.9 |
| San Pietro di Morubio | 3,145 | 16.12 | 195.1 |
| San Pietro in Cariano | 12,996 | 20.24 | 642.1 |
| San Zeno di Montagna | 1,544 | 28.24 | 54.7 |
| Sanguinetto | 4,318 | 13.51 | 319.6 |
| Sant'Ambrogio di Valpolicella | 11,870 | 23.50 | 505.1 |
| Sant'Anna d'Alfaedo | 2,660 | 43.43 | 61.2 |
| Selva di Progno | 921 | 41.34 | 22.3 |
| Soave | 7,126 | 22.72 | 313.6 |
| Sommacampagna | 14,480 | 40.83 | 354.6 |
| Sona | 17,761 | 41.15 | 431.6 |
| Sorgà | 2,979 | 31.54 | 94.5 |
| Terrazzo | 2,143 | 20.53 | 104.4 |
| Torri del Benaco | 2,856 | 46.30 | 61.7 |
| Tregnago | 5,065 | 37.35 | 135.6 |
| Trevenzuolo | 2,801 | 26.94 | 104.0 |
| Valeggio sul Mincio | 16,040 | 63.96 | 250.8 |
| Velo Veronese | 772 | 18.90 | 40.8 |
| Verona | 255,139 | 198.92 | 1,282.6 |
| Veronella | 5,189 | 20.88 | 248.5 |
| Vestenanova | 2,499 | 24.18 | 103.3 |
| Vigasio | 10,342 | 30.76 | 336.2 |
| Villa Bartolomea | 5,895 | 52.99 | 111.2 |
| Villafranca di Verona | 32,785 | 57.34 | 571.8 |
| Zevio | 15,937 | 54.87 | 290.5 |
| Zimella | 4,881 | 20.10 | 242.8 |

== See also ==
- List of municipalities of Veneto
- List of municipalities of Italy
