= Battle of Arcole =

1796 battle of the Italian campaign of 1796–1797

- Part of the Italian campaign of 1796–1797 in the War of the First Coalition
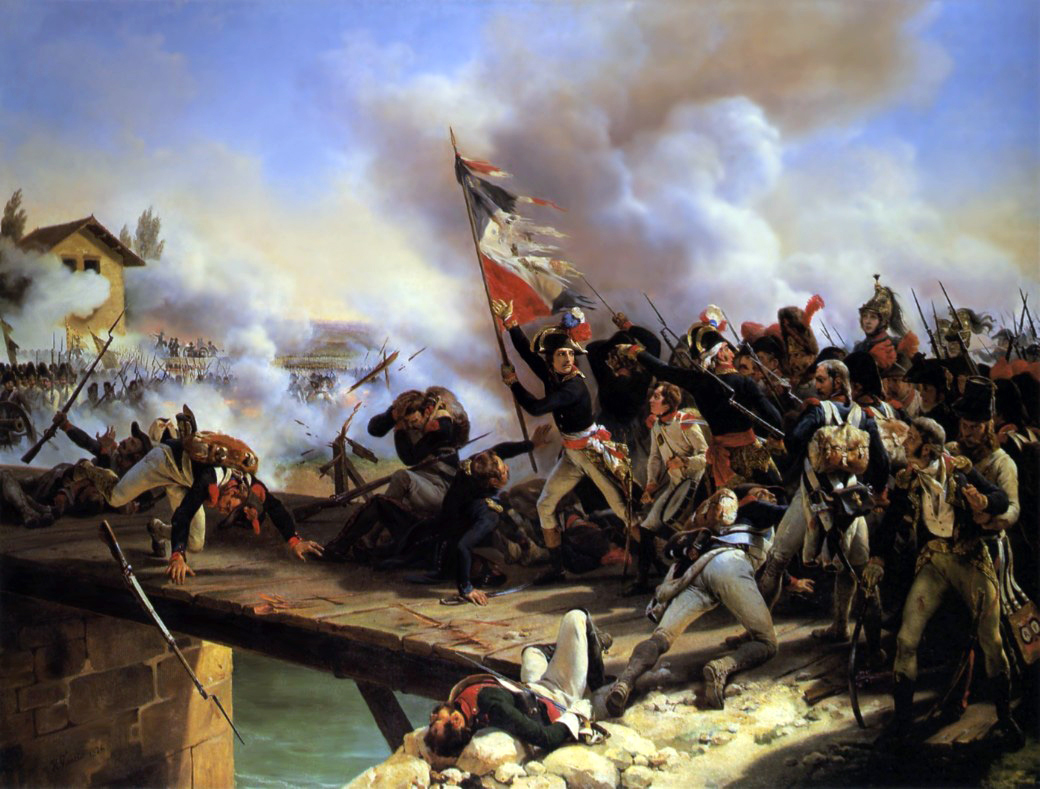
- The Crossing of the Arcole Bridge; Horace Vernet, 1826
Date	15–17 November 1796
Location	Arcole, Republic of Venice 45°21′26″N 11°16′39″E
Result	French victory

Belligerents
French Republic	Habsburg monarchy

Commanders and leaders
Napoleon Bonaparte; André Masséna; Pierre Augereau; Jean Lannes (WIA); Jean Joseph Guieu; Jean-Baptiste Muiron †; Józef Sułkowski; Jean Gilles André Robert (DOW)	József Alvinczi; Anton Ferdinand Mittrowsky; Giovanni Marchese di Provera; Adolf Brabeck †; Wenzel Brigido

Strength
20,000	24,000

Casualties and losses
3,500 killed or wounded 1,300 captured	2,200 killed or wounded 4,000 captured
- Location within Europe

War of the First Coalition:
Italian Campaign
current battle
Napoleon as subordinate
Napoleon in command

The Battle of Arcole or the Battle of Arcola (15–17 November 1796) (French: Bataille du pont d'Arcole, German: Schlacht bei Arcole) was fought between French and Austrian forces 25 kilometres (16 mi) southeast of Verona during the War of the First Coalition, a part of the French Revolutionary Wars. The battle saw a bold maneuver by Napoleon Bonaparte's French Army of Italy to outflank the Austrian army led by József Alvinczi and cut off its line of retreat. The French victory proved to be a highly significant event during the third Austrian attempt to lift the siege of Mantua. Alvinczi planned to execute a two-pronged offensive against Bonaparte's army. The Austrian commander ordered Paul Davidovich to advance south along the Adige River valley with one corps while Alvinczi led the main army in an advance from the east. The Austrians hoped to raise the siege of Mantua where Dagobert Sigmund von Wurmser was trapped with a large garrison. If the two Austrian columns linked up and if Wurmser's troops were released, French prospects were grim.

Davidovich scored a victory against Claude-Henri Belgrand de Vaubois at Calliano and threatened Verona from the north. Meanwhile, Alvinczi repulsed one attack by Bonaparte at Bassano and advanced almost to the gates of Verona where he defeated a second French attack at Caldiero. Leaving Vaubois' battered division to contain Davidovich, Bonaparte massed every available man and tried to turn Alvinczi's left flank by crossing the Adige. For two days the French assaulted the stoutly defended Austrian position at Arcole without success. Their persistent attacks finally forced Alvinczi to withdraw on the third day. That day Davidovich routed Vaubois, but it was too late. Bonaparte's victory at Arcole permitted him to concentrate against Davidovich and chase him up the Adige valley. Left alone, Alvinczi threatened Verona again. But without his colleague's support, the Austrian commander was too weak to continue the campaign and he withdrew again. Wurmser attempted a breakout, but his effort came too late in the campaign and had no effect on the result. The third relief attempt failed by the narrowest of margins.

== Background ==
=== Armies ===
The second relief attempt of the siege of Mantua ended badly for Austria when General Napoleon Bonaparte routed Feldmarschall Dagobert Sigmund von Wurmser's army at the Battle of Bassano. In the sequel, Wurmser marched for Mantua, evading French attempts to cut him off. He reached there with 16,000 soldiers on 12 September 1796, but was defeated and driven into the fortress by the French on the 15th. With Wurmser's Austrians and the original garrison crowded into the encircled city, disease and hunger began exacting a serious toll on the garrison. Emperor Francis II of Austria appointed Feldzeugmeister József Alvinczi to lead a reconstituted field army in the third attempt to relieve Mantua. Alvinczi, Feldmarschall-Leutnant Paul Davidovich, General-major Johann Rudolf Sporck, and Major Franz von Weyrother drew up plans for a two-pronged offensive. The Friaul Corps was assigned to Feldmarschall-Leutnant Peter Vitus von Quosdanovich and directed to move west toward Verona. The Tyrol Corps was entrusted to Davidovich and ordered to advance south from the Alps to join Quosdanovich. Wurmser would break out from Mantua and attack the French field armies in the rear.

Battles of San Michele, 2nd Bassano, and Calliano, Nov. 1796

Quosdanovich's 26,432-strong Friaul Corps was accompanied by Alvinczi as it moved west on Mantua from the Piave River. This force was formed into a 4,397-man Advance Guard under General-major Friedrich Franz Xaver Prince of Hohenzollern-Hechingen, a 4,376-strong Reserve led by General-major Philipp Pittoni von Dannenfeld, and a Main corps supervised by Feldmarschall-Leutnant Giovanni Marchese di Provera. This last unit was subdivided into a 9,380-man First line consisting of the brigades of Generals-major Gerhard Rosselmini and Anton Lipthay de Kisfalud and an 8,279-strong Second line composed of brigades led by Generals-major Anton Schübirz von Chobinin and Adolf Brabeck. There were 54 line and 20 reserve artillery pieces with the Friaul Corps.

On 1 November 1796, Davidovich's Tyrol Corps numbered 18,427 infantry and 1,049 cavalry. The corps was split into six brigade-size columns under Generals-major Johann Loudon, Joseph Ocskay von Ocsko, Sporck, and Josef Philipp Vukassovich and Colonel Seulen. Loudon commanded 3,915 infantry and 362 cavalry in Column 1, Ocskay led 4,200-foot soldiers and 463 horsemen in Column 2, Sporck directed 2,560 infantry in Column 3, Vukassovich supervised both Column 4 with 3,772-foot and 30 horse and Column 5 with 2,958-foot and 120 horse, and Seulen led 1,022 infantry and 74 cavalry in Column 6. The Tyrol Corps counted 40 line and 20 reserve guns.

Wurmser commanded 23,708 soldiers within Mantua. However, only 12,420 were reported as capable of taking the field. In addition, General-major Anton Ferdinand Mittrowsky's brigade occupied the upper Brenta River, connecting the wings under Davidovich and Quosdanovich. Mittrowsky commanded about 3,000 men.

Bonaparte deployed a 10,500-man division under General of Division Claude-Henri Belgrand de Vaubois at Lavis to watch Davidovich. At Bassano, General of Division André Masséna's 9,540 soldiers defended the line of the Brenta River. The 8,340 troops of General of Division Pierre Augereau covered the Adige River. General of Division Charles Edward Jennings de Kilmaine with 8,830 soldiers blockaded Wurmser's large garrison in Mantua. General of Division François Macquard's 2,750-man infantry reserve was posted at Villafranca di Verona while General of Division Thomas-Alexandre Dumas with 1,600 troopers of the cavalry reserve was stationed at Verona.

The Austrians went to a lot of trouble to conceal the strength of Davidovich's corps from their enemies. The ruse was so successful that Bonaparte ordered Vaubois to advance and defeat his opponent so that he could shift 3,000 troops to help fight Alvinczi. On 2 November, Vaubois attacked Davidovich near Cembra, inflicting 1,116 casualties before retiring. Though the French suffered only 650 killed and wounded, this included 280 soldiers of the 85th Line Infantry Demi Brigade. This loss seems to have seriously damaged the unit's morale. The next day, Vaubois pulled back to Calliano.

=== Second Bassano and Calliano ===
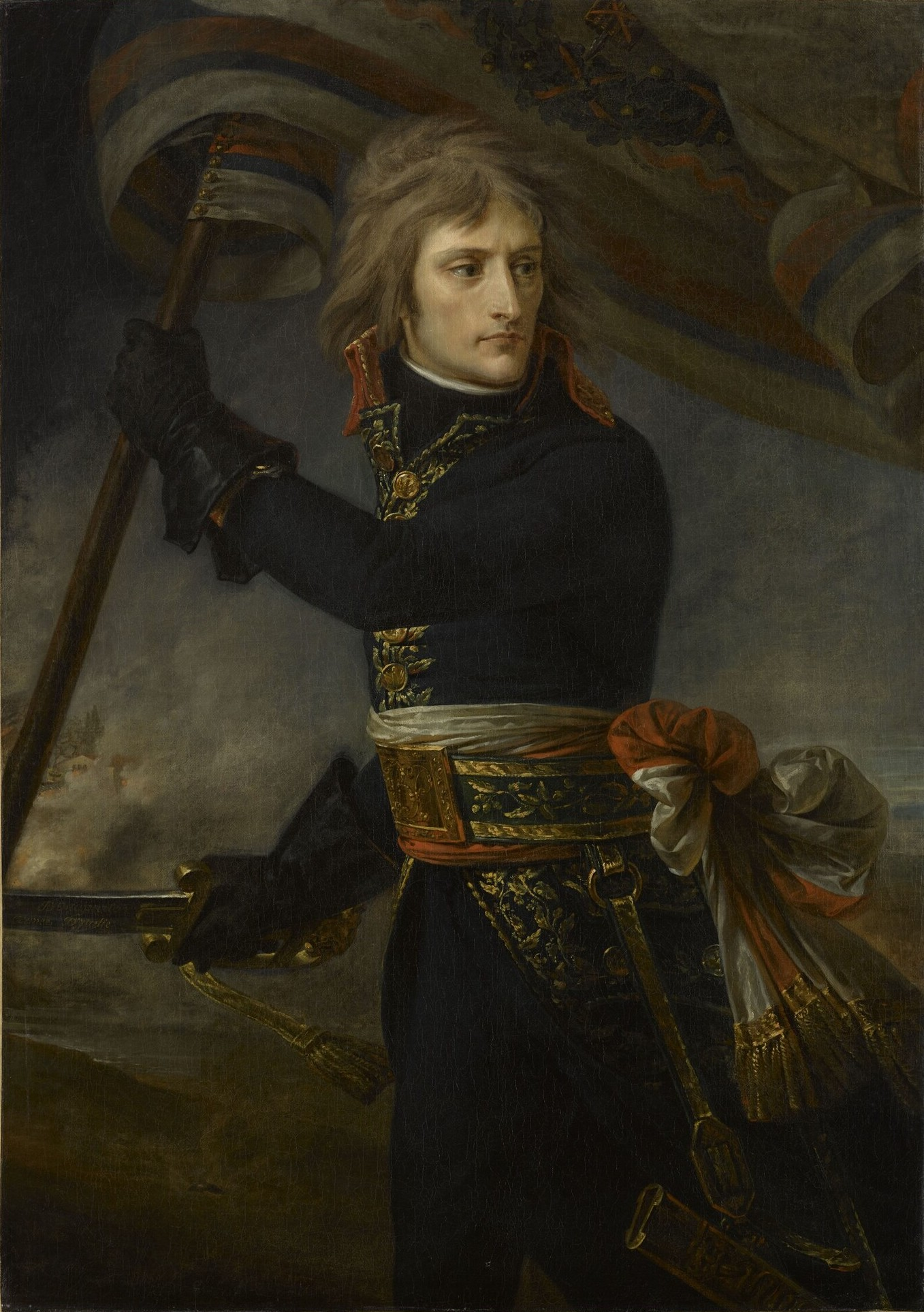
Bonaparte at the Bridge of Arcole, by A.-J. Gros, (1797), Château de Versailles.

On 1 November, the Friaul Corps began crossing the Piave. Bonaparte elected to attack the Austrians on the Brenta and called Augereau and Macquard east to join Masséna. In the Second Battle of Bassano on 6 November, the Austrians held off Bonaparte's attacks. French losses numbered 3,000 killed, wounded, and missing, plus an additional 508 men and one howitzer captured. In this hard-fought engagement, the Austrians lost 534 killed, 1,731 wounded, and 558 captured for a total of 2,823 casualties. Bonaparte quickly pulled back to Verona.

Davidovich attacked Vaubois at the Battle of Calliano on 6 November but was repulsed after hard fighting. He renewed his assault at daybreak on the 7th. Vaubois' men held out all day, but their morale collapsed in the late afternoon and they fled the battlefield in a panic. Between 2 and 7 November, Vaubois' division suffered 4,400 killed, wounded, and missing and lost six artillery pieces. The Austrians also lost heavily, with 2,000 killed and wounded plus a further 1,500 taken prisoner. In a public announcement, Bonaparte vented his fury at the poor performance of the 39th and 85th Line Infantry Demi Brigades.

Poor communications plagued the Austrian commanders throughout the campaign. This was a consequence of the wide separation between the two wings. Furthermore, many of Alvinczi's men were indifferently equipped raw recruits who straggled badly. The Austrians also suffered from a serious shortage of officers. After Alvinczi sent him a mistaken report that Masséna was reinforcing Vaubois, Davidovich became very cautious. The report was sent on 9 November but only reached its recipient on the 11th, which was typical of the Austrian communications problems. Alvinczi also repeatedly urged Davidovich to speed up his march toward Verona.

Alvinczi's advance guard under GM Friedrich of Hohenzollern-Hechingen pressed toward Verona. Near that city, he encountered Masséna on 11 November and was forced to pull back after losing 400 men in a sharp combat. In a sleet storm on the 12th, Hohenzollern fought off the attacks of Masséna and Augereau in the Battle of Caldiero. When reinforcements under Brabeck, Schübirz, and Provera arrived later in the day, Bonaparte called off the futile attacks and drew his troops back within the walls of Verona. The Austrians reported losses of 1,244 officers and men. French losses were estimated at 1,000 killed and wounded, plus an additional 800 men and two guns captured.

=== Maneuver ===
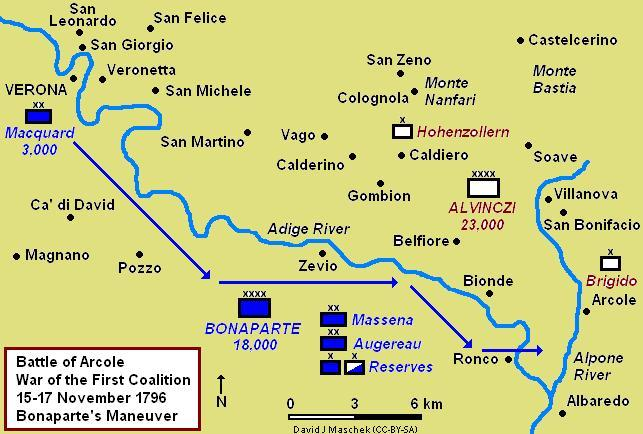
Bonaparte's maneuver from Verona to Ronco, 14–15 November 1796

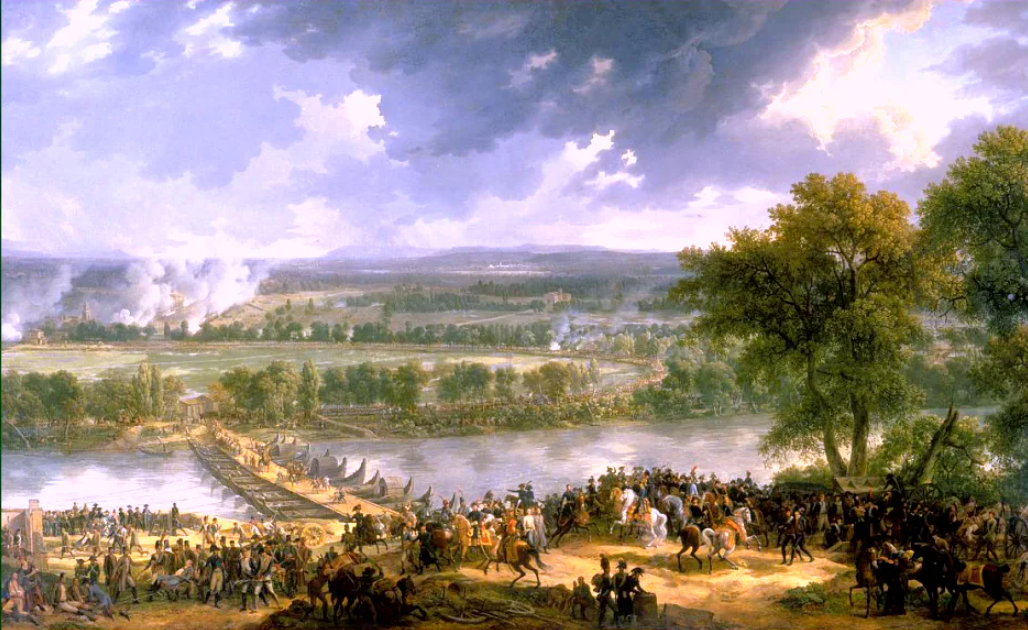
Battle of Arcole bridge, painted 1803 by Louis-Albert-Ghislain Bacler d'Albe depicting the crossing at Ronco

After two sharp defeats, even Bonaparte "became very despondent about his chances of survival." He deployed Macquard and 3,000 men to hold Verona. A slightly reinforced Vaubois clung to a strong position with about 8,000 troops, keeping Davidovich's 14,000 soldiers bottled up in the Adige valley. To blockade Wurmser's garrison within Mantua, Kilmaine could count only 6,626 men after providing reinforcements to other commands. This left Bonaparte a field force consisting of Masséna's 7,937, Augereau's 6,000, a reserve of 2,600 infantry plus cavalry, for a total of 18,000 soldiers. By this time, Alvinczi's main force numbered about 23,000 men. Historian David G. Chandler wrote,

Like a juggler keeping three balls in the air at once, Bonaparte had to balance the dangers of the three sectors against each other, keeping them in clear relative perspective. Although he had singled out Alvinczi as his main target, it was only too clear that an aggressive move on the part of Davidovich or even by Wurmser might compel the French to abandon their operations against the main Austrian army and move every available man to reinforce the threatened area. Defeat on any sector could well spell catastrophe and the destruction of the Army of Italy.

Unknown to the French, Alvinczi planned to throw a pontoon bridge across the Adige below Verona at Zevio on 15 November at nightfall. Meanwhile, Bonaparte determined on an audacious strategy. He force-marched Masséna and Augereau along the west bank of the Adige to a bridging site at Ronco all'Adige, behind Alvinczi's left flank. Once he moved his army across the river, he planned to move north to cut the Austrian line of retreat and seize the enemy's trains and artillery park.

On the far bank was an area of marshy land that troops could not penetrate, which meant that all movement was limited to the causeways or dikes on the banks of the river Adige, and the causeways on the banks of a small tributary called the Alpone River that flowed into it from the north. The Alpone was only 20 yards (18 m) wide and 5 feet (1.5 m) deep. In the difficult terrain, the French soldiers might have an advantage. Further, the Austrians would not be able to use their superior numbers in the restricted battlefield.

From Ronco, the north-bound road followed a dike for about 1.5 miles (2.4 km) to a bridge, on the east side of which was the village of Arcole. From there, the road continued going north on the east bank of the stream to San Bonifacio near the main highway. The dikes along the Alpone near Arcole were "26 feet high, and had very steep faces." Another road followed a dike from Ronco northwest to Belfiore and on to Caldiero.

== Battle ==
=== First day ===
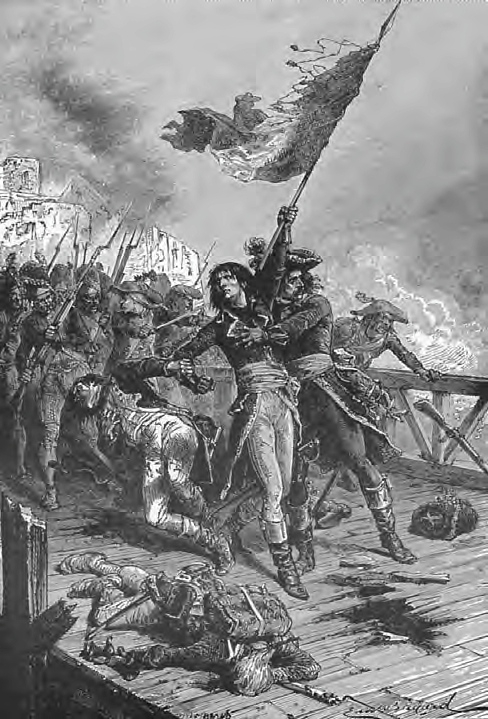
This engraving shows Bonaparte crossing the Arcole bridge. Actually the incident occurred about 55 paces short of the span.

By dawn on 15 November, Bonaparte's troops reached the intended crossing, and soon afterward Chef de brigade (Colonel) Antoine-François Andréossy's engineers had a pontoon bridge in operation. Augereau's division crossed first and headed east and north toward Arcole. Masséna's soldiers followed and, to cover the left flank, took a causeway leading north and west toward Belfiore di Porcile.

Alvinczi posted Oberst (Colonel) Wenzel Brigido's four battalions in the area; of these, two battalions and two cannons defended Arcole. These troops repulsed Augereau's leading demi-brigade under General of Brigade Louis André Bon. Before long, most of the French soldiers were lying in the lee of the causeway to shelter from the searing fire. Brigido pulled every available man into the combat. Augereau threw in demi-brigades led by Generals of Brigade Jean-Antoine Verdier and Pierre Verne. At mid-day, Austrian reinforcements led by General-Major Anton Ferdinand Mittrowsky began arriving to help the defenders. Soon, Bon, Verdier, Verne and General of Brigade Jean Lannes were all wounded and the attack completely stalled.

On the western flank, Alvinczi sent the brigades of Oberstleutnant (Lieutenant Colonel) Alois von Gavasini and General-Major Adolf Brabeck to seize the French pontoon bridge. They collided with Masséna near Bionde, midway between Belfiore and Ronco. Initially successful, the Austrians were soon driven back beyond Belfiore after Brabeck's troops accidentally fired on Gavasini's men, causing a panic. Once they reached Belfiore, the French watched as the Austrian trains rolled east on the main highway, out of their reach.

Attempting to break the stalemate near Arcole, Bonaparte ordered General of Brigade Jean Joseph Guieu with two demi-brigades to boat across the Adige below its confluence with the Alpone at Albaredo d'Adige. He also sent a French battalion across the Alpone by boat near its mouth. The latter unit fought its way north along the east bank dike.

Trying to inspire his men to attack, Bonaparte grabbed a flag and stood in the open on the dike "about 55 paces" from the bridge. He remained miraculously untouched, but several members of his staff were hit by the intense fire and his aide-de-camp, Jean-Baptiste Muiron, was killed. An unknown officer dragged Bonaparte out of the line of fire and the commanding general ended up in the muddy ditch.

Adding to the confusion, the Austrians launched a sortie from Arcole and defeated the French battalion on the east bank. In the evening, Guieu crossed at Albaredo and eventually managed to flush the Austrian defenders out of Arcole. At midnight, worried that Davidovich was about to fall upon his rear, Bonaparte withdrew Guieu from Arcole and pulled most of his troops back across the Adige. He left a garrison on the Austrian side of the river to hold his bridgehead.

=== Second day ===
Alvinczi left Hohenzollern's troops near Verona to guard against an attack from that city. The Austrian leader ordered Provera with six battalions to attack from Belfiore. Alvinczi reinforced Mittrowsky to a total of 14 battalions, including the brigades of Schübirz and Oberst Franz Sticker, and instructed him to advance south from Arcole. The two forces would march at dawn on 16 November and converge on the French bridgehead. Alvinczi sent two battalions to guard Albaredo against a repetition of Guieu's attack.

Provera's effort came to grief when he ran into Masséna. Brabeck was killed during the encounter and the Austrians were chased back to Belfiore with the loss of five cannons. During the morning, Mittrowsky and Augereau engaged in a see-saw battle that ended when the Austrians fell back to Arcole.

Mittrowsky positioned Sticker's four battalions on the western dike, lined the eastern dike with four battalions under Brigido, and packed the rest of his troops into Arcole. These intelligent dispositions blocked Bonaparte's repeated attempts to seize the village during the day. French attempts to cross the Adige at Albaredo and the Alpone near its mouth both failed. At nightfall, Bonaparte withdrew Masséna and Augereau toward the bridgehead, but sizable forces stayed on the Austrian side of the Adige.

The former slave Joseph Hercule Domingue, French cavalry lieutenant, was promoted to captain and given a ceremonial sword by Bonaparte for his actions in executing a surprise attack on the Austrian cavalry on this day of the battle.

=== Third day ===
On 17 November, Alvinczi withdrew Hohenzollern to Caldiero, closer to his main body. Again, Provera held Belfiore while Mittrowsky defended Arcole. During the night, Bonaparte's engineers floated some pontoons into the Alpone where they built a bridge near its mouth. Augereau's division crossed the bridge and began fighting its way along the eastern dike. A French battalion and some cavalry also set out from Legnago and joined Augereau later in the day. Meanwhile, two of Masséna's demi-brigades led by General of Brigade Jean Gilles André Robert attacked along the western dike.

By early afternoon, Masséna drubbed Provera near Belfiore again. Alvinczi recalled both Provera and Hohenzollern toward the east and began feeding some of the latter's troops into the combat at Arcole. There, the battle went back and forth all day. At 3:00 pm, a large column of Austrian reinforcements surged out of Arcole and drove back the troops under Robert. Augereau's men on the east bank saw this development and also fell back. By 4:00 pm, Augereau's rattled division pulled back across the pontoon bridge to the west bank.

Just when the day seemed lost, Masséna appeared with reinforcements from the western flank. With these, he ambushed the Austrians on the western dike and sent them reeling back toward Arcole. Heartened, Augereau's men recrossed to the east bank of the Alpone and renewed the fight. Masséna and Augereau finally battled their way into Arcole around 5:00 pm. A lieutenant and 25 Guides aided the final attack by riding into the Austrian rear area and blowing several bugles to create the impression of a large force. The French followed up their success by advancing north and threatening to block the main east-west highway. Alvinczi threw in Schübirz's brigade to hold off the French, and this allowed Provera's division to escape to the east.

== Aftermath ==
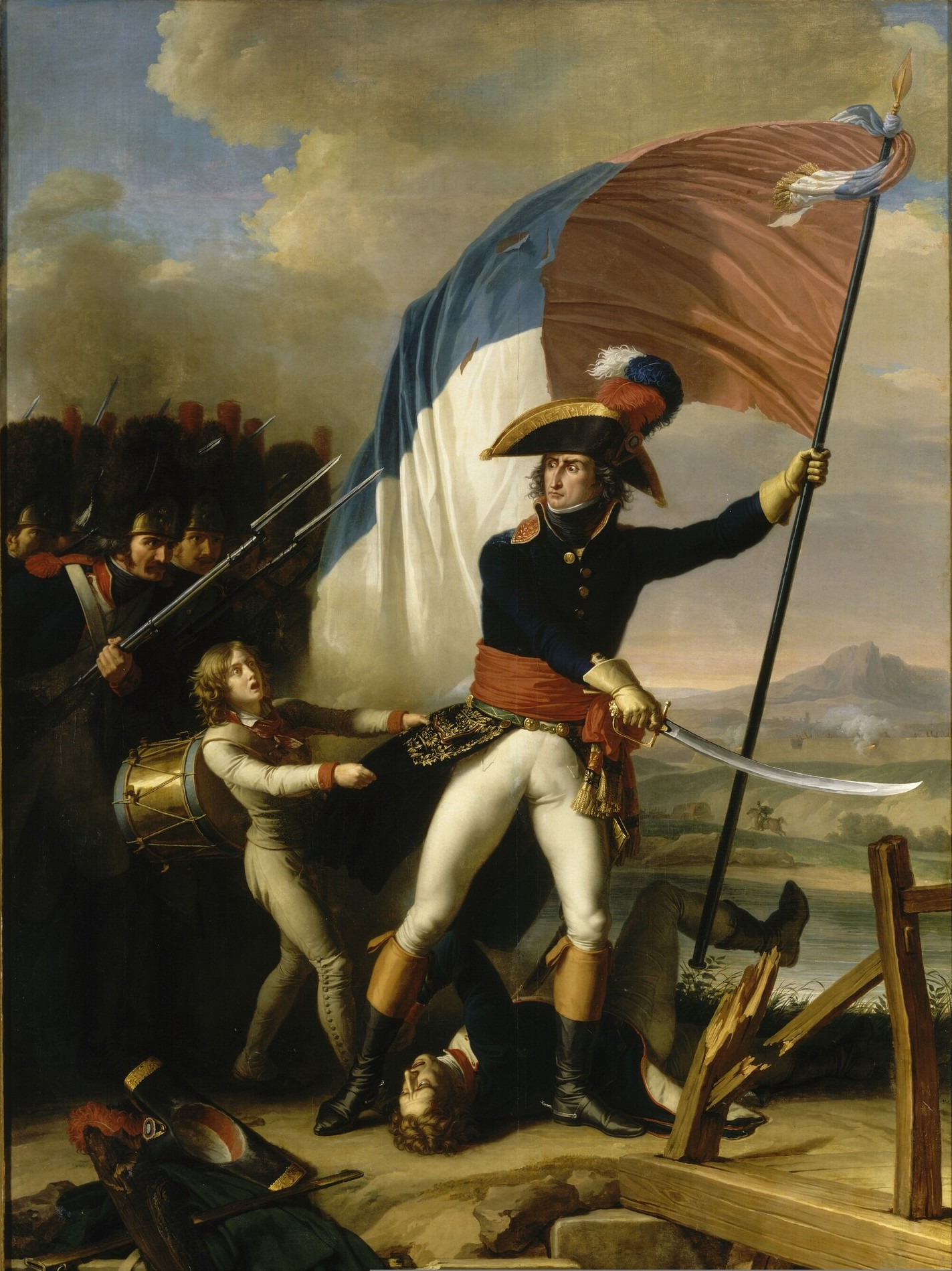
General Augereau at the Bridge of Arcole by Charles Thévenin, 1798

French losses at Arcole numbered 3,500 dead and wounded, plus 1,300 captured or missing. The Austrians suffered only 2,200 dead and wounded, but 4,000 men and 11 guns were captured by the French. On the French side, General Jean Gilles André Robert was mortally wounded, while Austrian General-Major Gerhard Rosselmini died in Vicenza on 19 November. On 17 November, Davidovich finally attacked Vaubois at Rivoli. Ocskay's brigade from Monte Baldo met Vukassovich's brigade from the Adige gorge, and together they drove the French soldiers steadily back. After resisting all morning the French troops stampeded in the afternoon. Again, the 85th Line was among the first units to panic. The French lost 800 killed and wounded, plus 1,000 captured including Generals of Brigade Pascal Antoine Fiorella and Antoine Valette. Austrian casualties were 600. Vaubois pulled back toward Peschiera del Garda while Davidovich pursued as far as Castelnuovo del Garda. Bonaparte sent his cavalry to watch Alvinczi's retreat, while turning the bulk of his forces toward Davidovich. On 19 November, Davidovich heard of the Austrian defeat at Arcole and detected signs that Bonaparte was about to fall upon him in full force. The Austrian pulled back to Rivoli on the 20th and began to fall back farther the next morning. At this moment, he received an encouraging note from Alvinczi and halted his retreat. But the French caught up with him at Rivoli. In the ensuing clash, the French suffered 200 casualties while inflicting losses of 250 killed and wounded. An additional 600 Austrians, three guns and a bridging train fell into French hands. Davidovich hastily fell back north. Altogether, Davidovich's retreat from Rivoli cost him as many as 1,500 men and nine guns.

After Arcole, Alvinczi pulled back to Olmo where he held a council of war on the morning of 18 November. At this meeting, the Austrian generals gamely decided to return to the field with their 16,000 remaining troops. By 21 November, Alvinczi occupied Caldiero again but could go no farther. While there, he heard of Davidovich's defeat on 23 November. That evening the Austrian field army began its retreat to the Brenta. During the three days that the battle of Arcole raged, cannon fire could be heard in Mantua. Observers in the fortress even noticed that some of the French camps seemed to be empty, yet Wurmser unaccountably failed to act. On 23 November, Wurmser assaulted the siege lines, capturing 200 Frenchmen and demolishing some earthworks. The Austrians suffered almost 800 casualties. When he learned that Davidovich was in full retreat, Wurmser withdrew into the city. In November 1796, the French seized Venice and two 44-gun frigates that were being built in the shipyard. One of the warships was named the Muiron in honor of Bonaparte's aide who was killed at his side on 15 November. When Bonaparte returned from Egypt in 1799, he escaped to France on the Muiron. Napoleon's actions at the bridge of Arcole were quickly turned legendary by French artists and newspapers, making Napoleon a household name among the French. Thus, Arcole is widely regarded as the beginning of the Napoleonic legend, which would last until Napoleon's downfall in 1815.

== Footnotes ==
Preceded by Battle of Calliano	French Revolution: Revolutionary campaigns Battle of Arcole	Succeeded by French expedition to Ireland (1796)
