= Veronella =

- Comune
- Comune di Veronella
- Location within Italy Location within Veneto
- Coordinates: 45°19′N 11°20′E
- Country: Italy
- Region: Veneto
- Province: Province of Verona (VR)
- Frazioni: San Gregorio

Area
  - Total: 20.8 km^{2} (8.0 sq mi)
- Elevation: 21 m (69 ft)

Population (Dec. 2004)
  - Total: 3,946
  - Density: 190/km^{2} (491/sq mi)
- Demonym: Veronellesi
- Time zone: UTC+1 (CET)
  - Summer (DST): UTC+2 (CEST)
- Postal code: 37040
- Dialing code: 0442

Veronella is a comune (municipality) in the Province of Verona in the Italian region Veneto, located about 80 kilometres (50 mi) west of Venice and about 30 kilometres (19 mi) southeast of Verona. As of 31 December 2004, it had a population of 3,946 and an area of 20.8 square kilometres (8.0 mi^{2}).

The municipality of Veronella contains the frazione (subdivision) San Gregorio.

Veronella borders the following municipalities: Albaredo d'Adige, Arcole, Belfiore, Bonavigo, Cologna Veneta, Minerbe, Pressana, and Zimella.

== Demographic evolution ==
Historical population

Year	Pop.	±%
1861	?	—
1871	2,902	—
1881	3,301	+13.7%
1901	3,159	−4.3%
1911	3,790	+20.0%

Year	Pop.	±%
1921	4,327	+14.2%
1931	4,268	−1.4%
1936	4,186	−1.9%
1951	4,508	+7.7%
1961	3,720	−17.5%

Year	Pop.	±%
1971	3,353	−9.9%
1981	3,431	+2.3%
1991	3,442	+0.3%
2001	3,696	+7.4%

Source: Data from ISTAT

== See also ==
- breach at Cucca
