= Ronco all'Adige =

- Comune
- Comune di Ronco all'Adige
- Location within Italy Location within Veneto
- Coordinates: 45°20′N 11°14′E
- Country: Italy
- Region: Veneto
- Province: Province of Verona (VR)

Area
  - Total: 42.6 km^{2} (16.4 sq mi)
- Elevation: 23 m (75 ft)

Population (oct. 2018)
  - Total: 6,002
  - Density: 141/km^{2} (365/sq mi)
- Demonym: Ronchesani
- Time zone: UTC+1 (CET)
  - Summer (DST): UTC+2 (CEST)
- Postal code: 37055
- Dialing code: 045

Ronco all'Adige is a comune (municipality) in the Province of Verona in the Italian region Veneto, located about 90 kilometres (56 mi) west of Venice and about 25 kilometres (16 mi) southeast of Verona. As of 31 October 2018, it had a population of 6,002 and an area of 42.6 square kilometres (16.4 mi^{2}).

Ronco all'Adige borders the following municipalities: Albaredo d'Adige, Belfiore, Isola Rizza, Oppeano, Palù, Roverchiara, and Zevio.

== Demographic evolution ==
Historical population

Year	Pop.	±%
1861	?	—
1871	4,440	—
1881	4,384	−1.3%
1901	4,496	+2.6%
1911	5,108	+13.6%

Year	Pop.	±%
1921	5,942	+16.3%
1931	6,350	+6.9%
1936	6,783	+6.8%
1951	7,074	+4.3%
1961	6,280	−11.2%

Year	Pop.	±%
1971	5,995	−4.5%
1981	5,873	−2.0%
1991	5,627	−4.2%
2001	5,684	+1.0%

Source: Data from ISTAT
