= Zevio =

- Comune
- Comune di Zevio
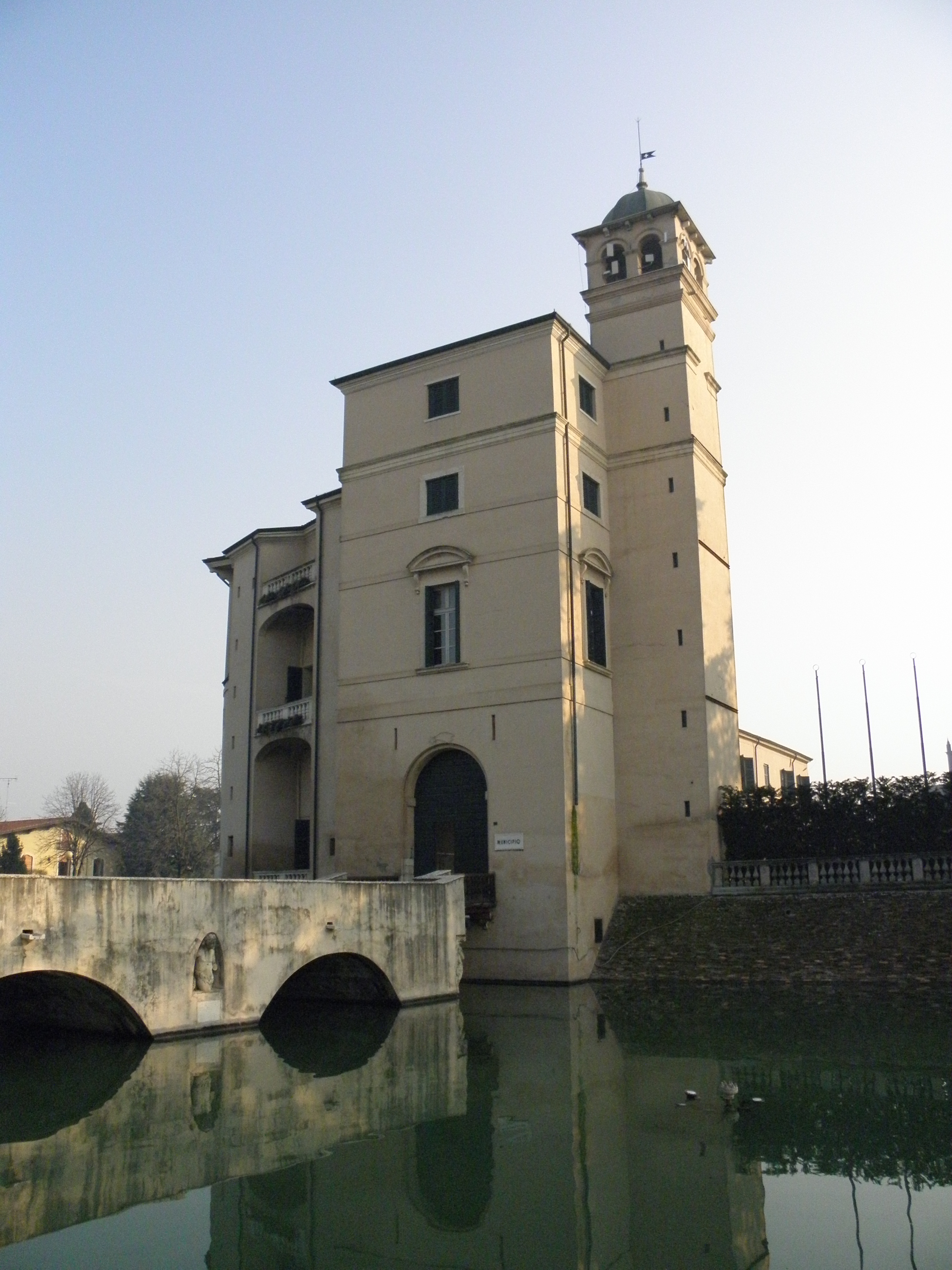
- Villa Sagramoso or "Il Castello".

- Location within Italy Location within Veneto
- Coordinates: 45°22′N 11°8′E
- Country: Italy
- Region: Veneto
- Province: Verona (VR)
- Frazioni: Bosco, Campagnola, Perzacco, Santa Maria, Volon

Government
  - Mayor: Diego Ruzza

Area
  - Total: 55.0 km^{2} (21.2 sq mi)
- Elevation: 31 m (102 ft)

Population (1 August 2014)
  - Total: 14,932
  - Density: 271/km^{2} (703/sq mi)
- Demonym: Zeviani
- Time zone: UTC+1 (CET)
  - Summer (DST): UTC+2 (CEST)
- Postal code: 37059
- Dialing code: 045
- Website: Official website

Zevio is a comune (municipality) in the Province of Verona in the Italian region Veneto, located about 90 kilometres (56 mi) west of Venice and about 14 kilometres (9 mi) southeast of Verona.

Zevio borders the following municipalities: Belfiore, Caldiero, Oppeano, Palù, Ronco all'Adige, San Giovanni Lupatoto, and San Martino Buon Albergo.

== Twin towns ==
Zevio is twinned with:

- Arborea, Italy
