= Albaredo d'Adige =

- Comune
- Comune di Albaredo d'Adige
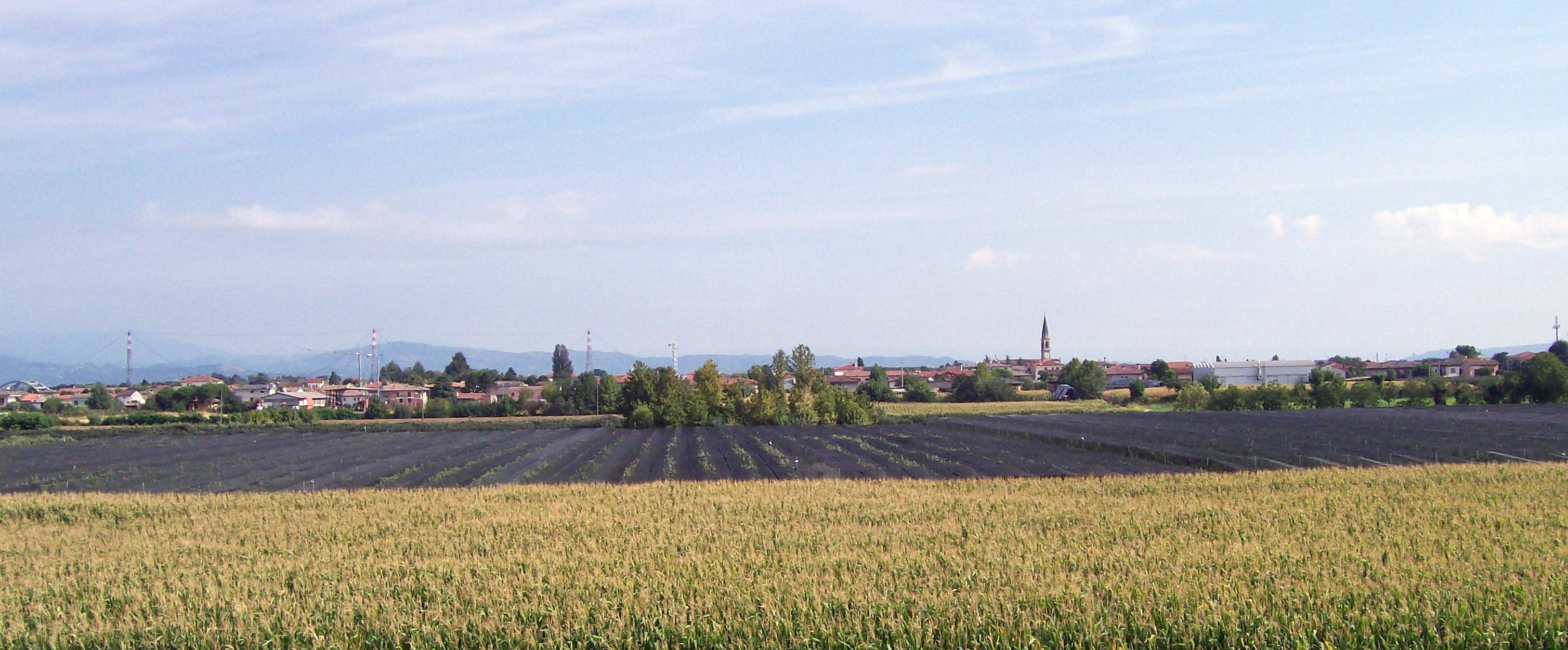
- View of the town

- Location of Albaredo d'Adige in Italy Albaredo d'Adige (Veneto)
- Coordinates: 45°19′N 11°16′E
- Country: Italy
- Region: Veneto
- Province: Province of Verona (VR)
- Frazioni: Coriano, Michellorie e Presina

Area
  - Total: 28.2 km^{2} (10.9 sq mi)
- Elevation: 24 m (79 ft)

Population (31 December 2020)
  - Total: 5,209
  - Density: 185/km^{2} (478/sq mi)
- Demonym: Albaretani
- Time zone: UTC+1 (CET)
  - Summer (DST): UTC+2 (CEST)
- Postal code: 37041, 37040 frazioni
- Dialing code: 045
- Website: Official website

Albaredo d'Adige is a comune (municipality) in the Province of Verona in the Italian region Veneto, located about 80 kilometres (50 mi) west of Venice and about 25 kilometres (16 mi) south of Verona. It is located on the river Adige. As of 2004, it had a population of 5,138 and an area of 28.2 square kilometres (10.9 mi^{2}).

The municipality of Albaredo d'Adige contains the frazioni (subdivisions, mainly villages and hamlets) Coriano, Michellorie and Presina.

Albaredo d'Adige borders the following municipalities: Belfiore, Bonavigo, Ronco all'Adige, Roverchiara, and Veronella.

== Culture ==
=== Architecture ===
==== Churches ====
Every subdivision of Albaredo d'Adige has a patron saint with a church dedicated to that saint.

- The patron of Albaredo is Santa Maria Assunta - the church dates back to the 18th century.
- The patrons of Coriano are Saints Filippo and Giacomo - the church was first built in the early 18th century and was rebuilt in 1795.
- The patron of Michellorie is Santa Maria della Salute.
- The patron of Presina is Visitazione di Maria Santissima.
- In the district of San Tomio, there is the monastery of Saints Nazaro and Celso.
- In the district of Cadelsette, there is a small church dedicated to St. Lucy that has frescoes from the 15th century.

==== Villas ====
In the zone of Albaredo there are many villas of the Venetian and Austrian periods.

- Villa Perosini-Fontana, in Albaredo, dates back to the 16th century, with a Renaissance structure.
- Villa Brena, in Coriano, was built in the 20th century in the style of the 18th century.
- Villa Serego-Rinaldi, in the district of Beccacivetta, near Coriano, dates back to the 9th century in its most ancient parts.

=== Festivals ===
- Sagra (fair) of Presina takes place in June. There is a funfair and traditional cooking.
- Sagra dei Fioi, in July. It takes place in Michellorie.
- Sagra of San Rocco, in Albaredo. It takes place in August and there is a funfair, traditional cooking and fireworks on the river Adige.
- Festival of the polenta, in September. There is traditional cooking.

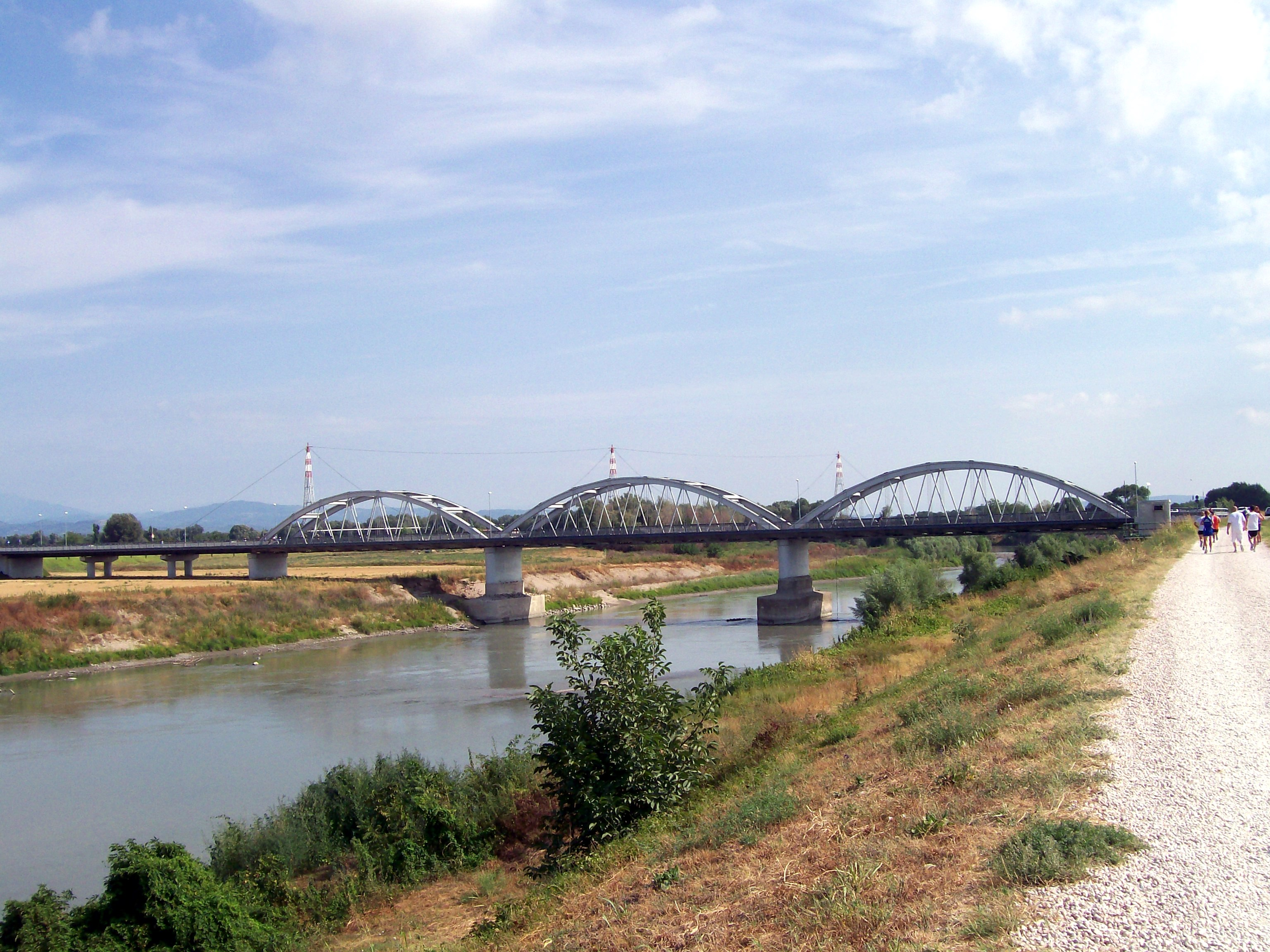
The bridge on the Adige
