= Angiari =

- Comune
- Comune di Angiari
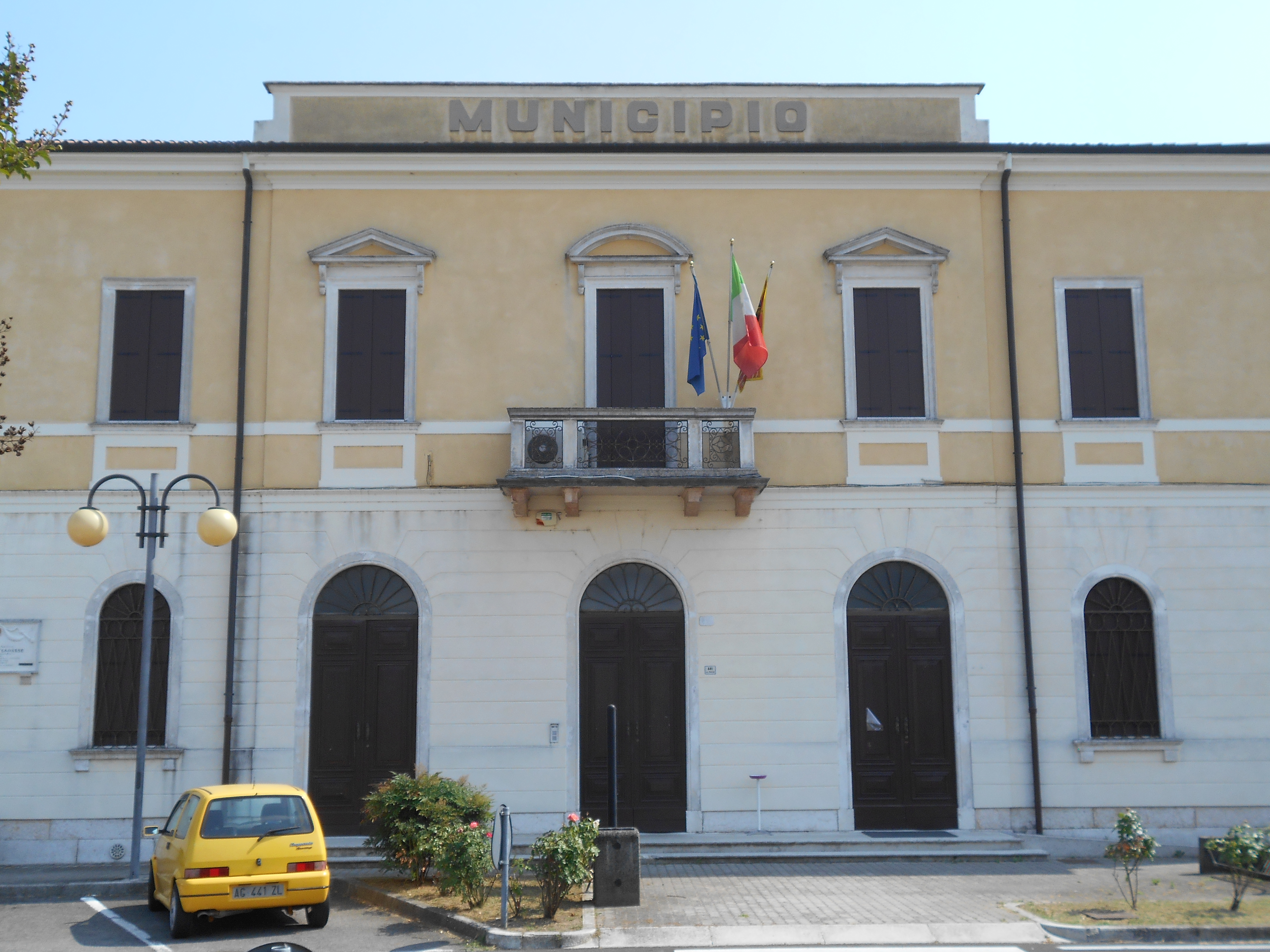
- Town hall

- Location of Angiari in Italy Angiari (Veneto)
- Coordinates: 45°13′N 11°17′E
- Country: Italy
- Region: Veneto
- Province: Province of Verona (VR)

Area
  - Total: 13.5 km^{2} (5.2 sq mi)
- Elevation: 17 m (56 ft)

Population (31 December 2020)
  - Total: 2,382
  - Density: 176/km^{2} (457/sq mi)
- Demonym: Angiaresi
- Time zone: UTC+1 (CET)
  - Summer (DST): UTC+2 (CEST)
- Postal code: 37050
- Dialing code: 0442

Angiari is a comune (municipality) in the Province of Verona in the Italian region Veneto, located about 80 kilometres (50 mi) southwest of Venice and about 35 kilometres (22 mi) southeast of Verona. As of 31 December 2004, it had a population of 1,892 and an area of 13.5 square kilometres (5.2 mi^{2}).

Angiari borders the following municipalities: Bonavigo, Cerea, Legnago, Roverchiara, and San Pietro di Morubio.

== Demographic evolution ==
Historical population

Year	Pop.	±%
1861	?	—
1871	2,140	—
1881	2,174	+1.6%
1901	1,932	−11.1%
1911	2,138	+10.7%
1921	2,284	+6.8%

Year	Pop.	±%
1931	2,317	+1.4%
1936	2,400	+3.6%
1951	2,508	+4.5%
1961	1,982	−21.0%
1971	1,835	−7.4%
1981	1,798	−2.0%

Year	Pop.	±%
1991	1,728	−3.9%
2001	1,844	+6.7%
2005	1,914	+3.8%
2011	2,177	+13.7%

Source: Data from ISTAT
