= Zimella =

- Comune
- Comune di Zimella
- Location within Italy Location within Veneto
- Coordinates: 45°20′N 11°23′E
- Country: Italy
- Region: Veneto
- Province: Province of Verona (VR)
- Frazioni: S. Stefano (capoluogo), Zimella, Bonaldo e Volpino

Area
  - Total: 20.1 km^{2} (7.8 sq mi)
- Elevation: 29 m (95 ft)

Population (Dec. 2004)
  - Total: 4,626
  - Density: 230/km^{2} (596/sq mi)
- Demonym: Zimellesi
- Time zone: UTC+1 (CET)
  - Summer (DST): UTC+2 (CEST)
- Postal code: 37040
- Dialing code: 0442

Zimella is a comune (municipality) in the Province of Verona in the Italian region Veneto, located about 70 kilometres (43 mi) west of Venice and about 35 kilometres (22 mi) southeast of Verona. As of 31 December 2004, it had a population of 4,626 and an area of 20.1 square kilometres (7.8 mi^{2}).

The municipality of Zimella contains the frazioni (subdivisions, mainly villages and hamlets) S. Stefano (capoluogo), Zimella, and Bonaldo e Volpino.

Zimella borders the following municipalities: Arcole, Cologna Veneta, Lonigo, and Veronella.

== Demographic evolution ==
Historical population

Year	Pop.	±%
1861	?	—
1871	3,620	—
1881	3,867	+6.8%
1901	4,029	+4.2%
1911	4,720	+17.2%

Year	Pop.	±%
1921	5,239	+11.0%
1931	5,286	+0.9%
1936	4,923	−6.9%
1951	5,176	+5.1%
1961	4,200	−18.9%

Year	Pop.	±%
1971	3,763	−10.4%
1981	3,710	−1.4%
1991	3,962	+6.8%
2001	4,342	+9.6%

Source: Data from ISTAT
