= San Pietro di Morubio =

- Comune
- Comunette de San Pietro de Morubio
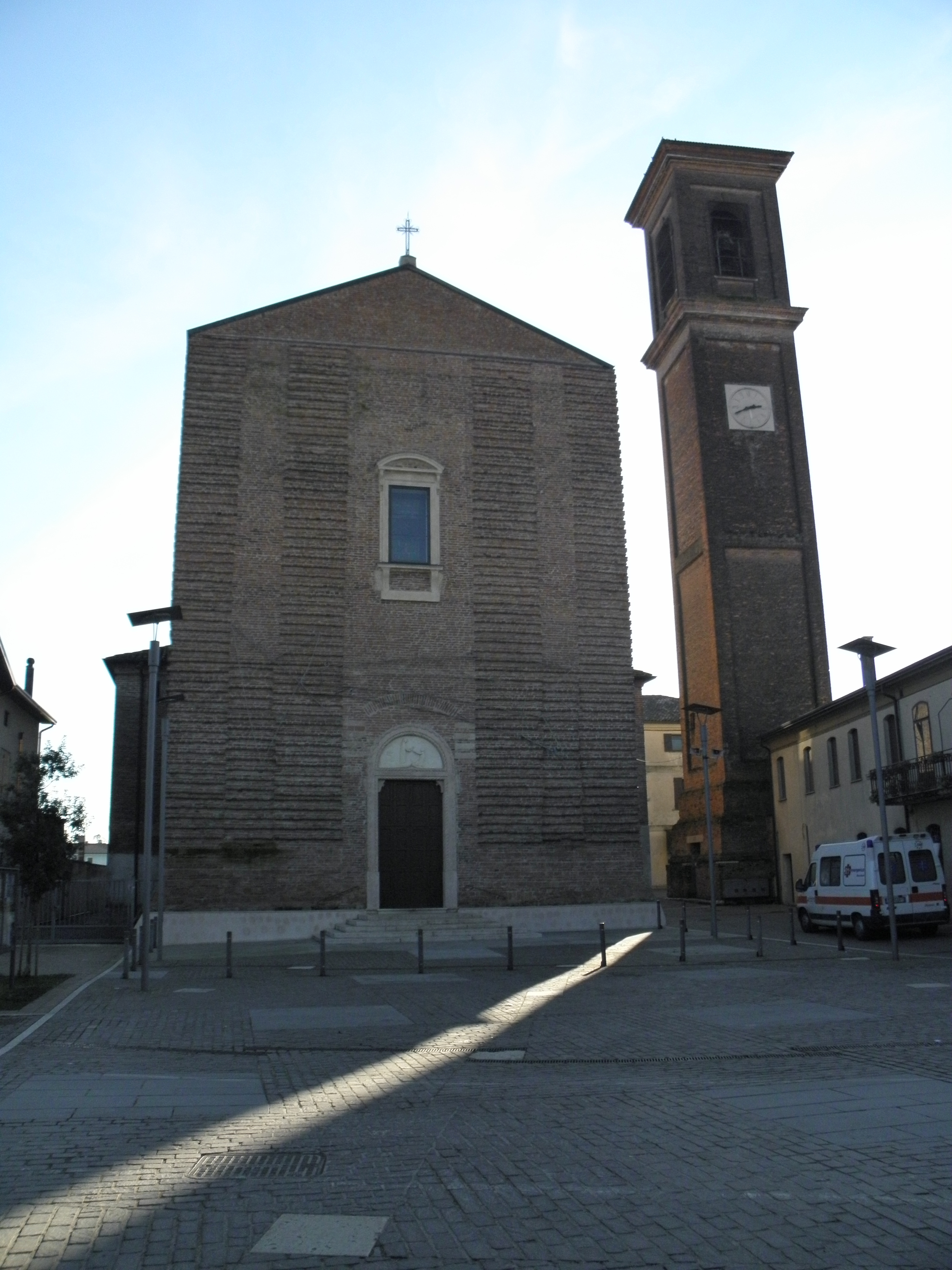

- Location within Italy Location within Veneto
- Coordinates: 45°15′N 11°14′E
- Country: Italy
- Region: Veneto
- Province: Province of Verona (VR)
- Frazioni: Bonavincia

Area
  - Total: 16.0 km^{2} (6.2 sq mi)
- Elevation: 19 m (62 ft)

Population (Dec. 2002)
  - Total: 2,828
  - Density: 177/km^{2} (458/sq mi)
- Demonym: Morubiani
- Time zone: UTC+1 (CET)
  - Summer (DST): UTC+2 (CEST)
- Postal code: 37050
- Dialing code: 045

San Pietro di Morubio is a comune (municipality) in the Province of Verona in the Italian region Veneto, located about 90 kilometres (56 mi) west of Venice and about 30 kilometres (19 mi) southeast of Verona. As of 31 December 2004, it had a population of 2,828 and an area of 16.0 square kilometres (6.2 mi^{2}).

The municipality of San Pietro di Morubio contains the frazione (subdivision) Bonavicina.

San Pietro di Morubio borders the following municipalities: Angiari, Bovolone, Cerea, Isola Rizza, and Roverchiara.

== Demographic evolution ==
Historical population

Year	Pop.	±%
1861	?	—
1871	2,284	—
1881	2,440	+6.8%
1901	2,390	−2.0%
1911	2,719	+13.8%

Year	Pop.	±%
1921	2,746	+1.0%
1931	2,976	+8.4%
1936	3,065	+3.0%
1951	3,303	+7.8%
1961	2,782	−15.8%

Year	Pop.	±%
1971	2,752	−1.1%
1981	2,906	+5.6%
1991	2,884	−0.8%
2001	2,848	−1.2%

Source: Data from ISTAT
