= Bonavigo =

- Comune
- Comune di Bonavigo
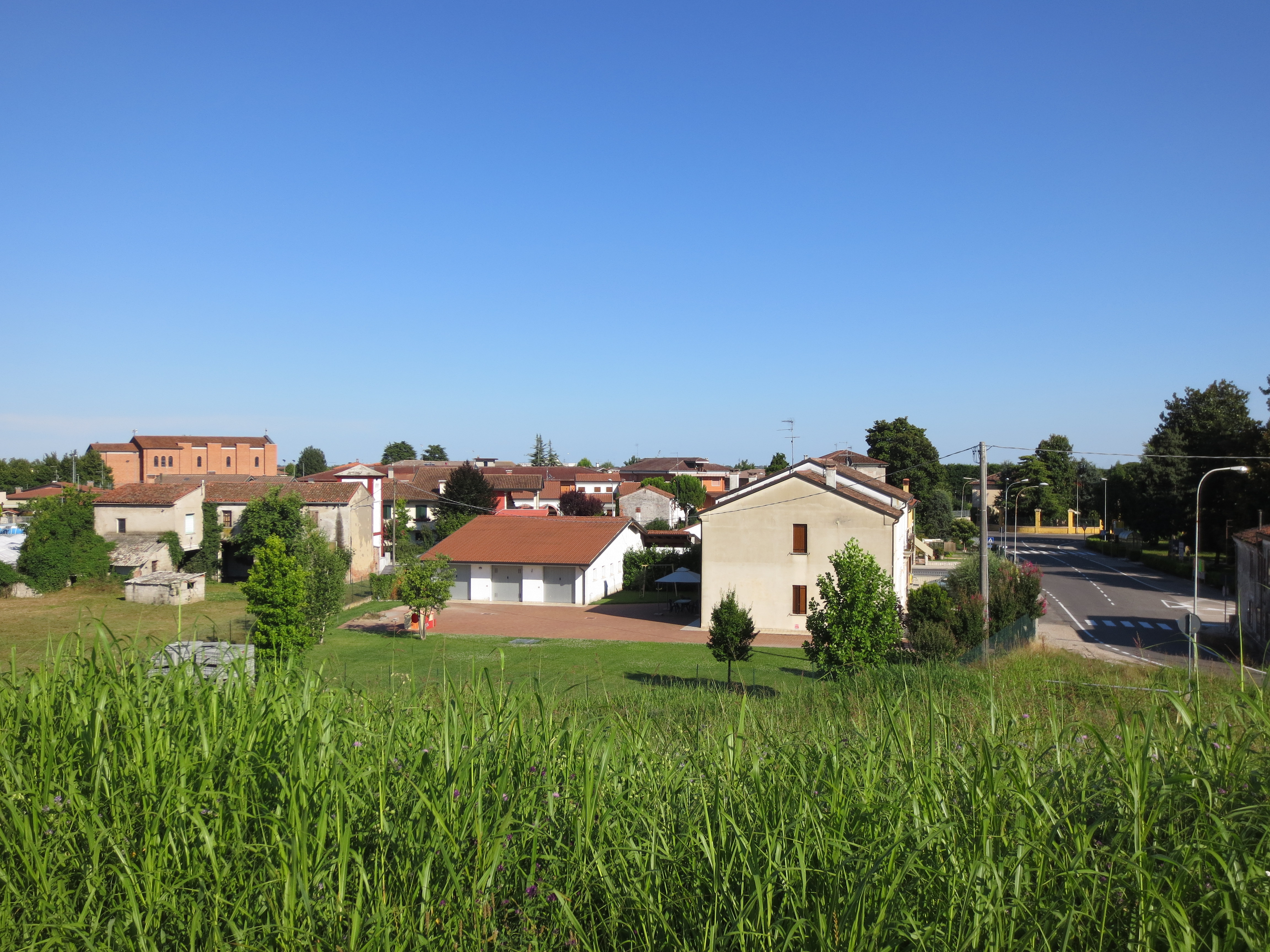

- Location within Italy Location within Veneto
- Coordinates: 45°15′N 11°17′E
- Country: Italy
- Region: Veneto
- Province: Province of Verona (VR)
- Frazioni: Bonavigo, Orti e Pilastro

Area
  - Total: 17.8 km^{2} (6.9 sq mi)
- Elevation: 19 m (62 ft)

Population (Dec. 2004)
  - Total: 1,990
  - Density: 112/km^{2} (290/sq mi)
- Demonym: Bonavighesi
- Time zone: UTC+1 (CET)
  - Summer (DST): UTC+2 (CEST)
- Postal code: 37040
- Dialing code: 0442
- Website: Official website

Bonavigo is a comune (municipality) in the Province of Verona in the Italian region Veneto, located about 80 kilometres (50 mi) west of Venice and about 30 kilometres (19 mi) southeast of Verona. As of 31 December 2004, it had a population of 1,990 and an area of 17.8 square kilometres (6.9 mi^{2}).

The municipality of Bonavigo contains the frazioni (subdivisions, mainly villages and hamlets) Bonavigo and Orti e Pilastro.

Bonavigo borders the following municipalities: Albaredo d'Adige, Angiari, Legnago, Minerbe, Roverchiara, and Veronella.

== Demographic evolution ==
Historical population

Year	Pop.	±%
1861	?	—
1871	2,034	—
1881	2,282	+12.2%
1901	2,039	−10.6%
1911	2,507	+23.0%

Year	Pop.	±%
1921	2,508	+0.0%
1931	2,536	+1.1%
1936	2,678	+5.6%
1951	2,883	+7.7%
1961	2,322	−19.5%

Year	Pop.	±%
1971	2,007	−13.6%
1981	2,020	+0.6%
1991	1,967	−2.6%
2001	1,881	−4.4%

Source: Data from ISTAT

== Twin towns ==
Bonavigo is twinned with:

- Ober-Hilbersheim, Germany
