= Isola Rizza =

- Comune
- Comune di Isola Rizza
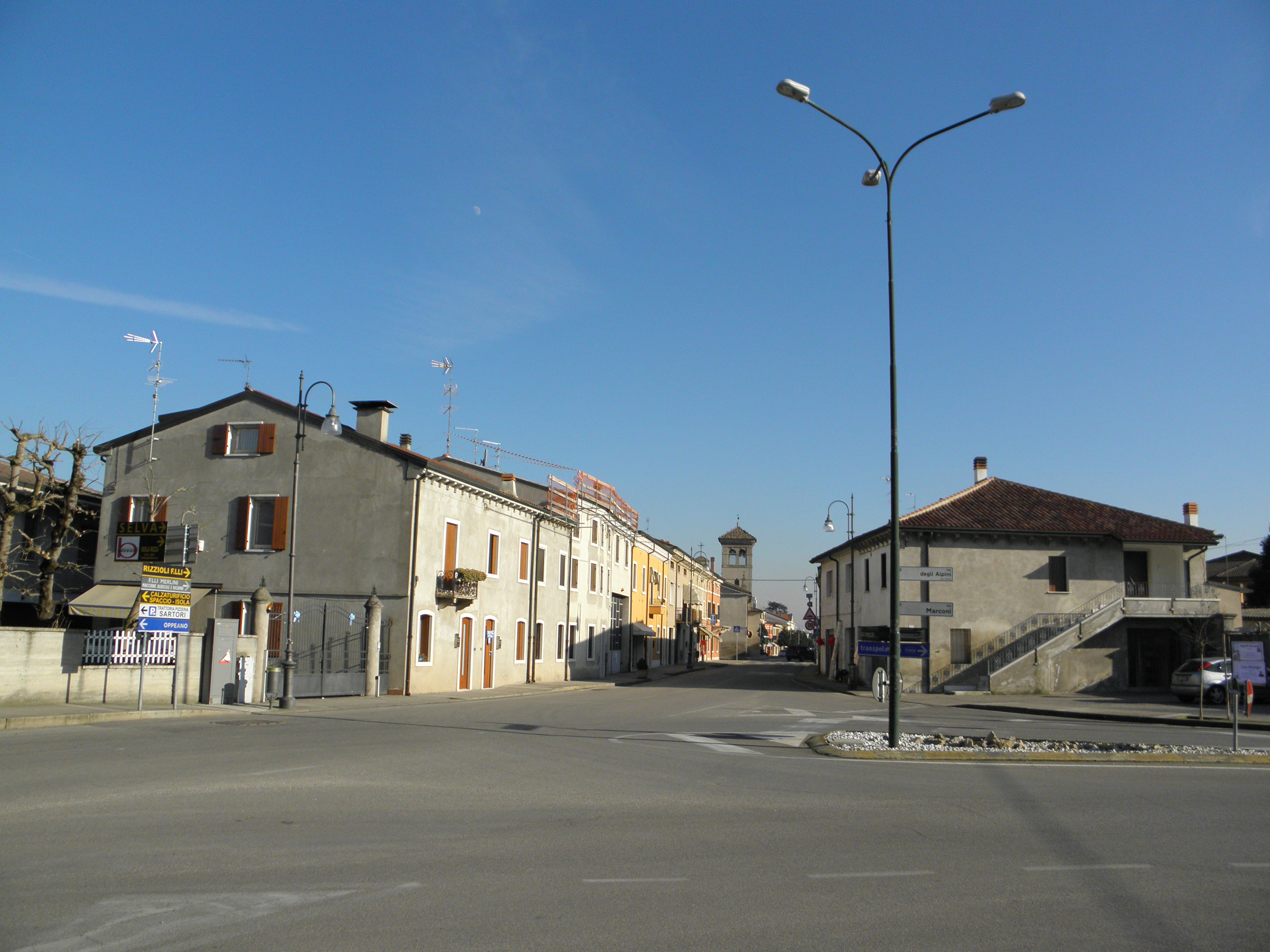

- Location within Italy Location within Veneto
- Coordinates: 45°17′N 11°12′E
- Country: Italy
- Region: Veneto
- Province: Province of Verona (VR)

Area
  - Total: 16.8 km^{2} (6.5 sq mi)
- Elevation: 23 m (75 ft)

Population (Dec. 2004)
  - Total: 2,977
  - Density: 177/km^{2} (459/sq mi)
- Demonym: Isolani
- Time zone: UTC+1 (CET)
  - Summer (DST): UTC+2 (CEST)
- Postal code: 37050
- Dialing code: 045
- Website: Official website

Isola Rizza is a comune (municipality) in the Province of Verona in the Italian region Veneto, located about 90 kilometres (56 mi) west of Venice and about 25 kilometres (16 mi) southeast of Verona. As of 31 December 2004, it had a population of 2,977 and an area of 16.8 square kilometres (6.5 mi^{2}).

Isola Rizza borders the following municipalities: Bovolone, Oppeano, Ronco all'Adige, Roverchiara, and San Pietro di Morubio.

In 1873, the 6th-century Isola Rizza dish was found in a hoard near the parish church.

== Ville and Palazzi ==
- Villa Maffei - 15th century
- Palazzo Dogana - 15th century
- Villa Pollettini - 15th century
- Villa Mandella - 16th century
- Villa Sagramoso Buri - 16th century
- Villa Bonanome Bellinato - 16th century
- Villa Martelli - 16th century
- Villa Ferrari - 18th century

== Demographic evolution ==
Historical population

Year	Pop.	±%
1861	?	—
1871	2,285	—
1881	2,282	−0.1%
1901	2,162	−5.3%
1911	2,418	+11.8%

Year	Pop.	±%
1921	2,667	+10.3%
1931	2,856	+7.1%
1936	2,926	+2.5%
1951	3,135	+7.1%
1961	2,585	−17.5%

Year	Pop.	±%
1971	2,299	−11.1%
1981	2,504	+8.9%
1991	2,711	+8.3%
2001	2,859	+5.5%

Source: Data from ISTAT
