= Roverchiara =

- Comune
- Comune di Roverchiara
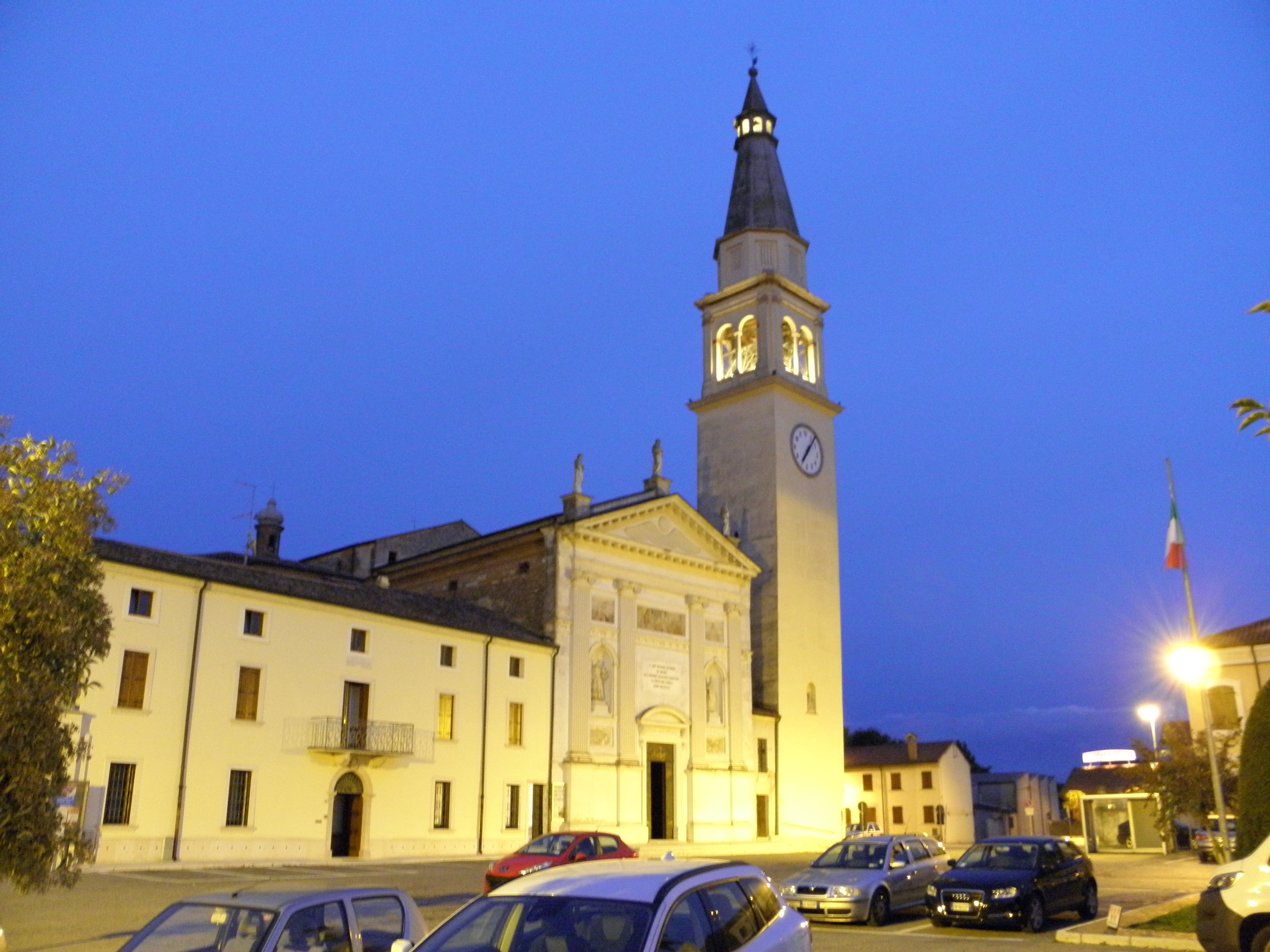
- Victory Emanuel II square with Saint Zeno church in the evening

- Location within Italy Location within Veneto
- Coordinates: 45°16′N 11°15′E
- Country: Italy
- Region: Veneto
- Province: Province of Verona (VR)
- Frazioni: Roverchiaretta

Area
  - Total: 19.8 km^{2} (7.6 sq mi)
- Elevation: 20 m (66 ft)

Population (Dec. 2004)
  - Total: 2,685
  - Density: 136/km^{2} (351/sq mi)
- Demonym: Roverchiaresi
- Time zone: UTC+1 (CET)
  - Summer (DST): UTC+2 (CEST)
- Postal code: 37050
- Dialing code: 0442
- Website: Official website

Roverchiara is a comune (municipality) in the Province of Verona in the Italian region Veneto, located about 90 kilometres (56 mi) west of Venice and about 30 kilometres (19 mi) southeast of Verona. As of 31 December 2004, it had a population of 2,685 and an area of 19.8 square kilometres (7.6 mi^{2}).

The municipality of Roverchiara contains the frazione (subdivision) Roverchiaretta.

Roverchiara borders the following municipalities: Albaredo d'Adige, Angiari, Bonavigo, Isola Rizza, Ronco all'Adige, and San Pietro di Morubio.

== Demographic evolution ==
Historical population

Year	Pop.	±%
1861	?	—
1871	3,242	—
1881	3,327	+2.6%
1901	3,150	−5.3%
1911	3,720	+18.1%

Year	Pop.	±%
1921	3,874	+4.1%
1931	3,938	+1.7%
1936	4,044	+2.7%
1951	4,025	−0.5%
1961	3,281	−18.5%

Year	Pop.	±%
1971	2,845	−13.3%
1981	2,685	−5.6%
1991	2,587	−3.6%
2001	2,655	+2.6%

Source: Data from ISTAT
