= Boschi Sant'Anna =

- Comune
- Comune di Boschi Sant'Anna
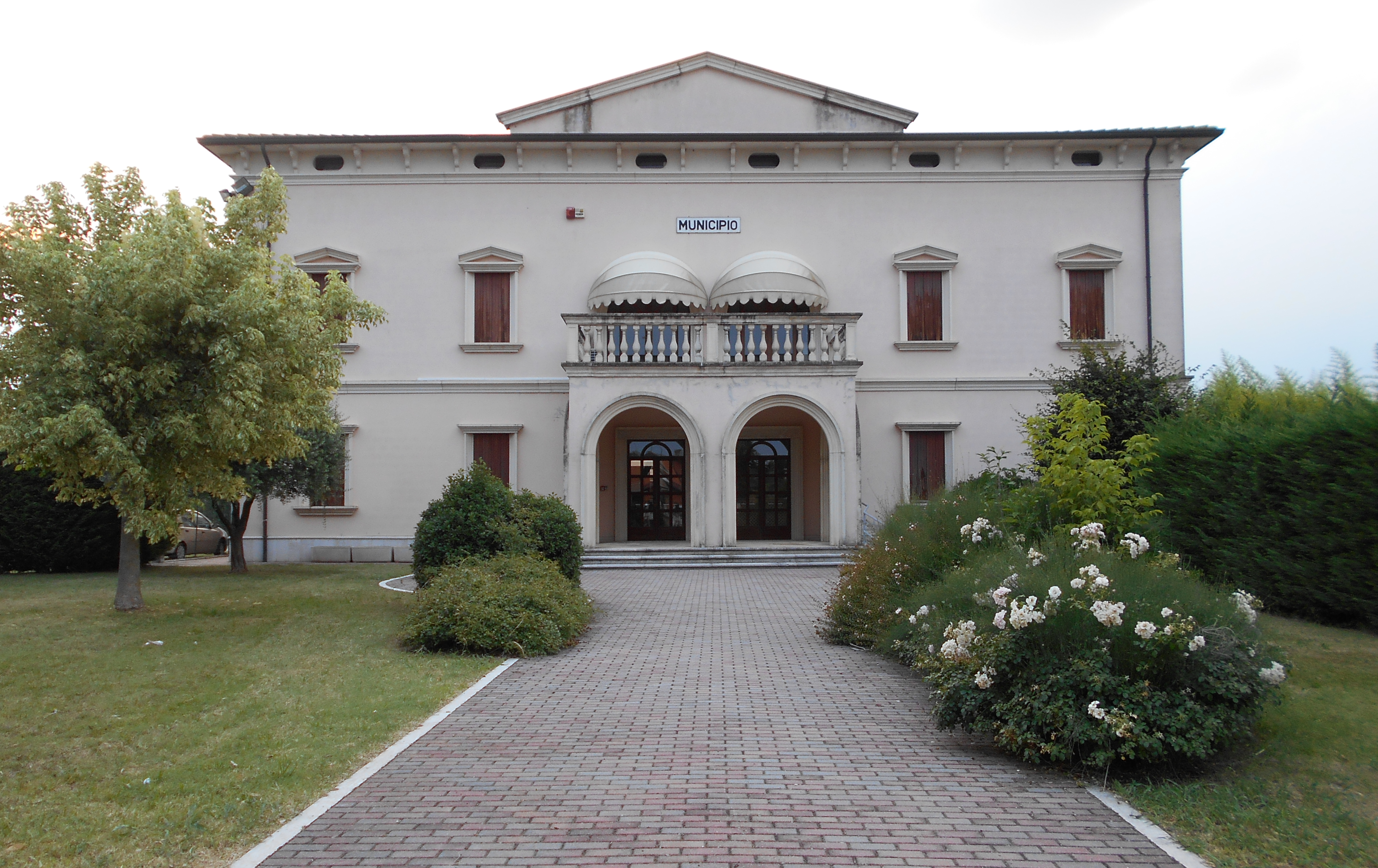
- Town hall

- Coat of arms

- Location within Italy Location within Veneto
- Coordinates: 45°13′N 11°22′E
- Country: Italy
- Region: Veneto
- Province: Verona (VR)
- Frazioni: Boschi, San Marco, Oni

Government
  - Mayor: Enrico Occhiali (since 2019)

Area
  - Total: 8.97 km^{2} (3.46 sq mi)
- Elevation: 10 m (33 ft)

Population (2024)
  - Total: 1,380
  - Density: 154/km^{2} (398/sq mi)
- Demonym: Santanesi
- Time zone: UTC+1 (CET)
  - Summer (DST): UTC+2 (CEST)
- Postal code: 37040
- Dialing code: 045
- Patron saint: St. Anne
- Saint day: July 26

Boschi Sant'Anna is a comune with 1,380 inhabitants in the province of Verona. It is 45 kilometres (28 mi) from Verona and east of Legnago.
