= Province of Verona =

Province of Italy, located in the Veneto region

Province of Verona Provincia di Verona (Italian)
- Province
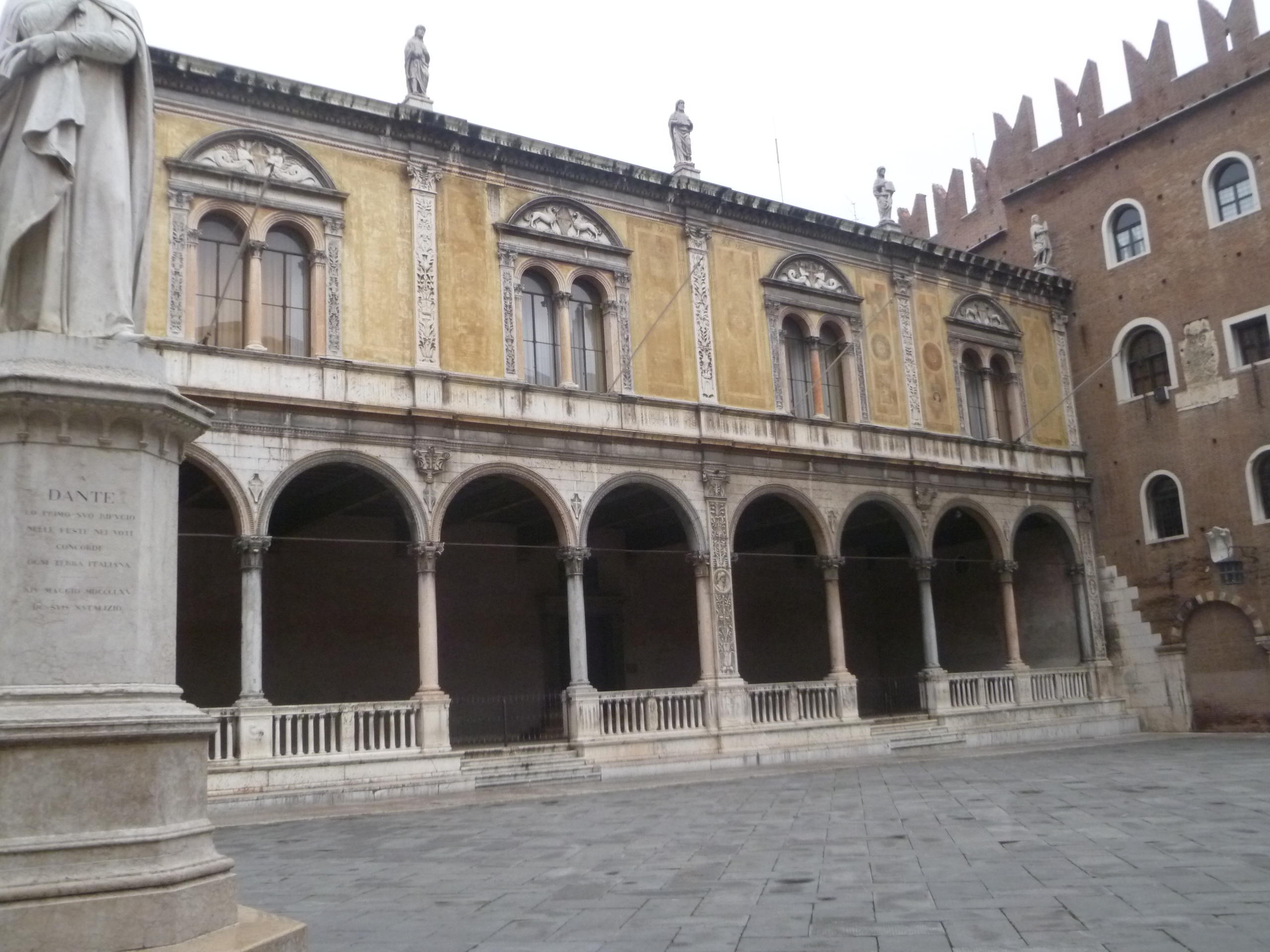
- Loggia del Consiglio, the provincial seat

- Flag Coat of arms

- Location of the province of Verona in Italy
- Coordinates: 45.43°N 10.98°E
- Country: Italy
- Region: Veneto
- Capital(s): Verona
- Municipalities: 98

Government
  - President: Flavio Pasini (Liga Veneta–Lega)

Area
  - Total: 3,096.39 km^{2} (1,195.52 sq mi)

Population (2026)
  - Total: 930,842
  - Density: 300.622/km^{2} (778.607/sq mi)

GDP
  - Total: €29.406 billion (2015)
  - Per capita: €31,858 (2015)
- Time zone: UTC+1 (CET)
  - Summer (DST): UTC+2 (CEST)
- Postal codes: 37010–37014; 37016–37024; 37026; 37028–37032; 37035–37036; 37039–37047; 37049–37060; 37063–37064; 37066–37069; 37121–37142
- Telephone prefix: 045, 0442
- ISO 3166 code: IT-VR
- Vehicle registration: VR
- ISTAT code: 023
- Website: portale.provincia.vr.it

The province of Verona (Italian: Provincia di Verona) is a province of the region of Veneto in northern Italy. On its northwestern border, Lake Garda—Italy's largest—is divided between Verona and the provinces of Brescia (Lombardy region) and Trentino (Trentino-Alto Adige/Südtirol region). Its capital is the city of Verona. The city is a UNESCO World Heritage Site.

The province has a population of 930,842 in an area of 3,096.39 square kilometres (1,195.52 sq mi) across its 98 municipalities.

The province is cosmopolitan in nature. It is bordered by Italian Tyrol in the north, province of Vicenza and province of Padua in the east, province of Rovigo and province of Mantua in the south, and Lake Garda in the west. From north to south the maximum extent of the province is 50 miles while it is 25 miles from east to west.

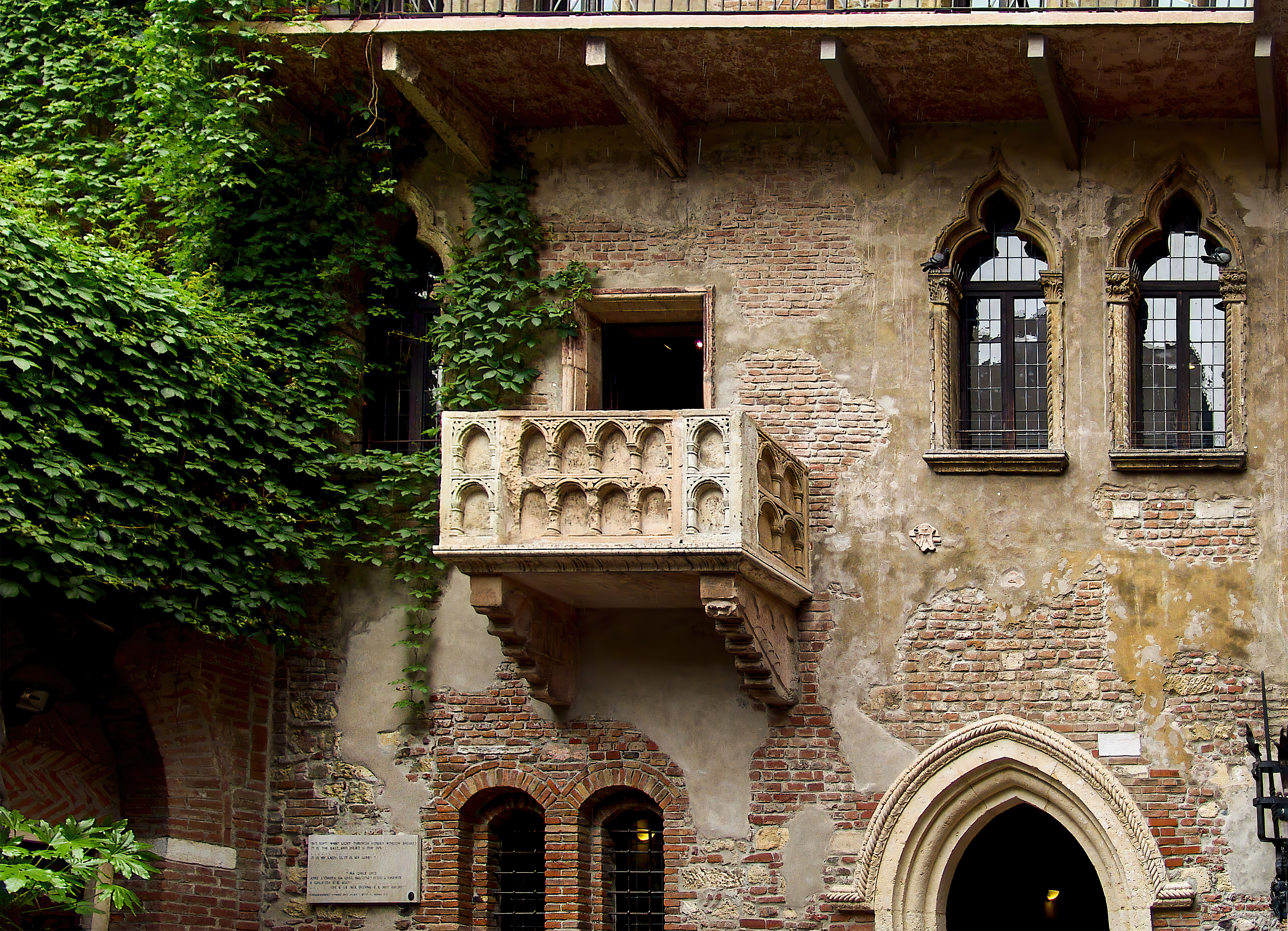
Juliet Capulet's villa in Verona

William Shakespeare's play Romeo and Juliet takes place in Verona, as do some scenes in his play The Two Gentlemen of Verona. Verona attracts many tourists, and the Casa di Giulietta (Juliet Capulet's villa in the play) is an important local visitor attraction.

== Municipalities ==
The province has 98 municipalities:

- Affi
- Albaredo d'Adige
- Angiari
- Arcole
- Badia Calavena
- Bardolino
- Belfiore
- Bevilacqua
- Bonavigo
- Boschi Sant'Anna
- Bosco Chiesanuova
- Bovolone
- Brentino Belluno
- Brenzone
- Bussolengo
- Buttapietra
- Caldiero
- Caprino Veronese
- Casaleone
- Castagnaro
- Castel d'Azzano
- Castelnuovo del Garda
- Cavaion Veronese
- Cazzano di Tramigna
- Cerea
- Cerro Veronese
- Cologna Veneta
- Colognola ai Colli
- Concamarise
- Costermano
- Dolcè
- Erbè
- Erbezzo
- Ferrara di Monte Baldo
- Fumane
- Garda
- Gazzo Veronese
- Grezzana
- Illasi
- Isola della Scala
- Isola Rizza
- Lavagno
- Lazise
- Legnago
- Malcesine
- Marano di Valpolicella
- Mezzane di Sotto
- Minerbe
- Montecchia di Crosara
- Monteforte d'Alpone
- Mozzecane
- Negrar
- Nogara
- Nogarole Rocca
- Oppeano
- Palù
- Pastrengo
- Pescantina
- Peschiera del Garda
- Povegliano Veronese
- Pressana
- Rivoli Veronese
- Roncà
- Ronco all'Adige
- Roverchiara
- Roverè Veronese
- Roveredo di Guà
- Salizzole
- San Bonifacio
- San Giovanni Ilarione
- San Giovanni Lupatoto
- San Martino Buon Albergo
- San Mauro di Saline
- San Pietro di Morubio
- San Pietro in Cariano
- San Zeno di Montagna
- Sanguinetto
- Sant'Ambrogio di Valpolicella
- Sant'Anna d'Alfaedo
- Selva di Progno
- Soave
- Sommacampagna
- Sona
- Sorgà
- Terrazzo
- Torri del Benaco
- Tregnago
- Trevenzuolo
- Valeggio sul Mincio
- Velo Veronese
- Verona
- Veronella
- Vestenanova
- Vigasio
- Villa Bartolomea
- Villafranca di Verona
- Zevio
- Zimella
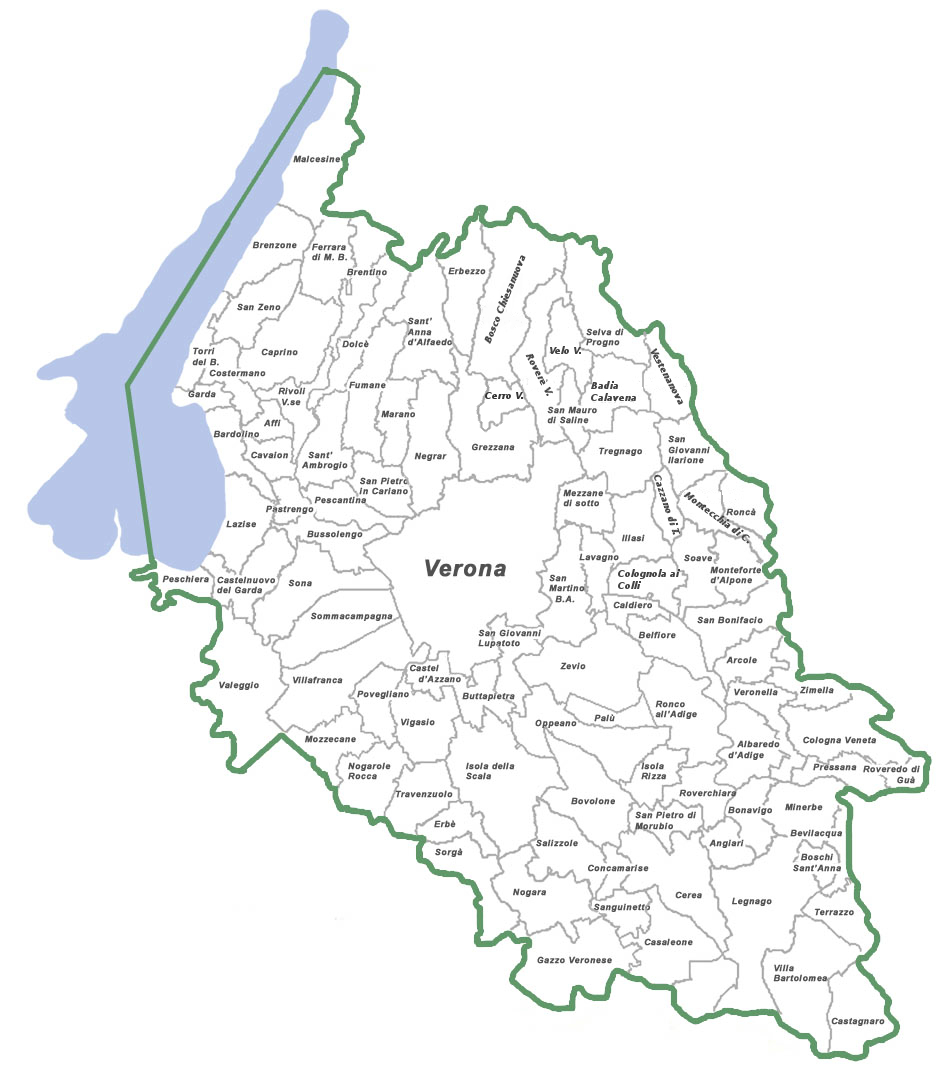
Municipalities of the province

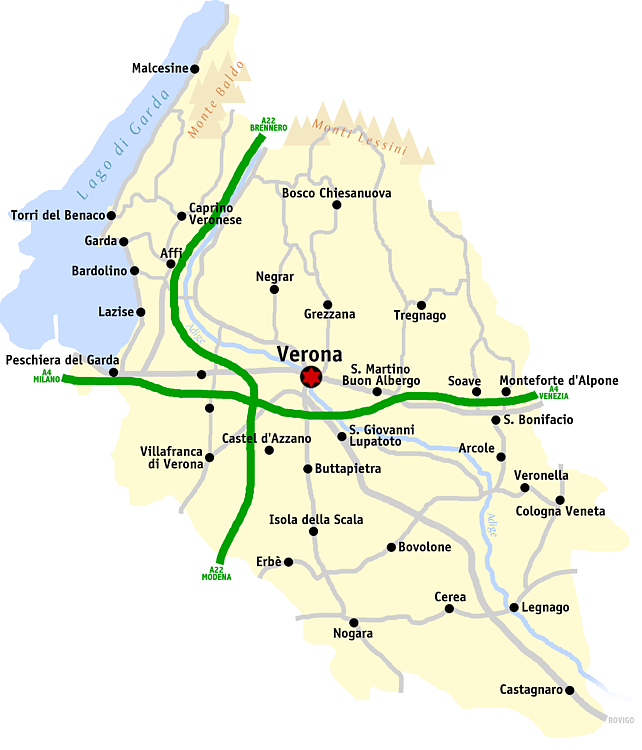
Cities, towns and roads of the province

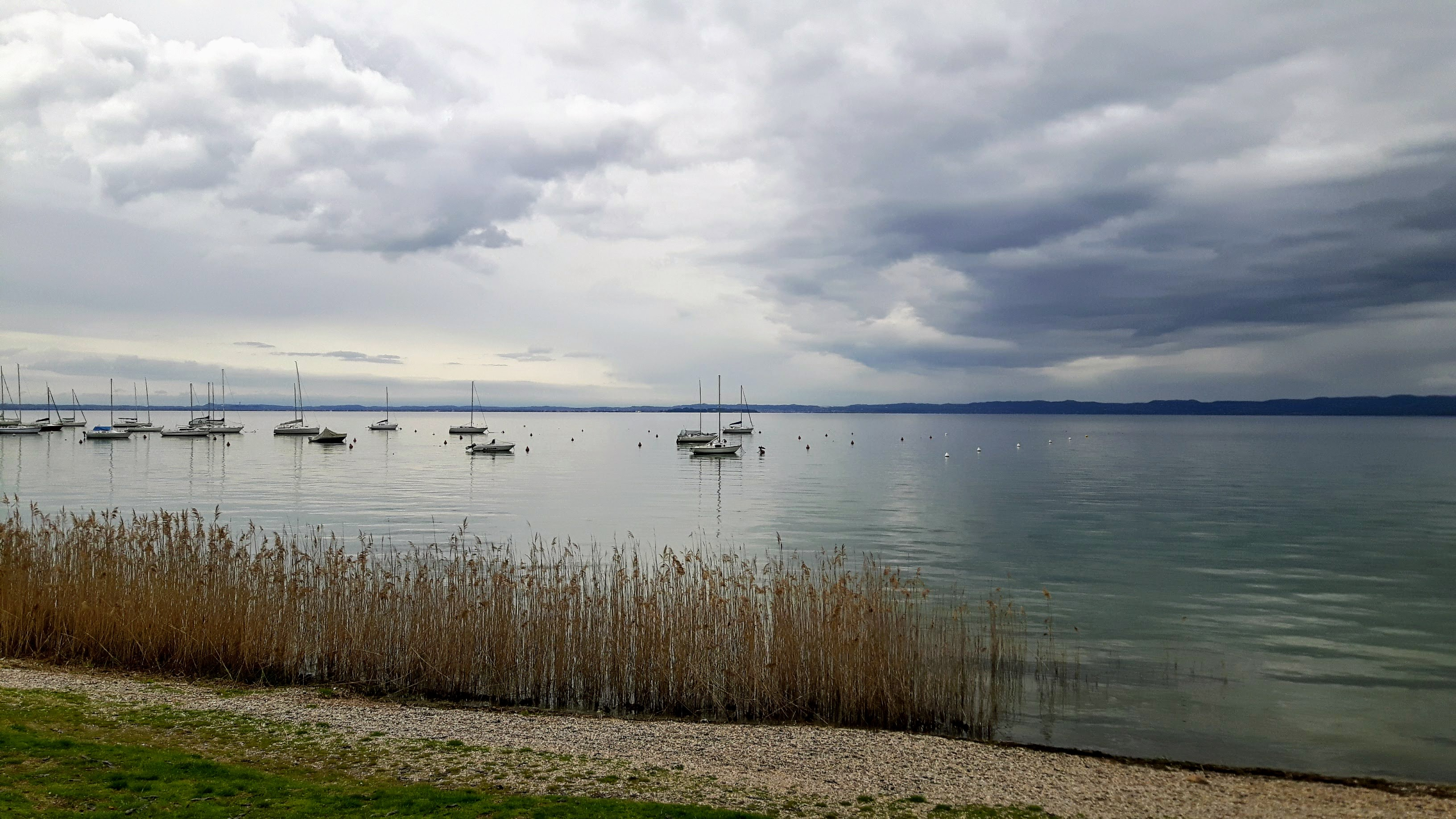
Lake Garda in Bardolino

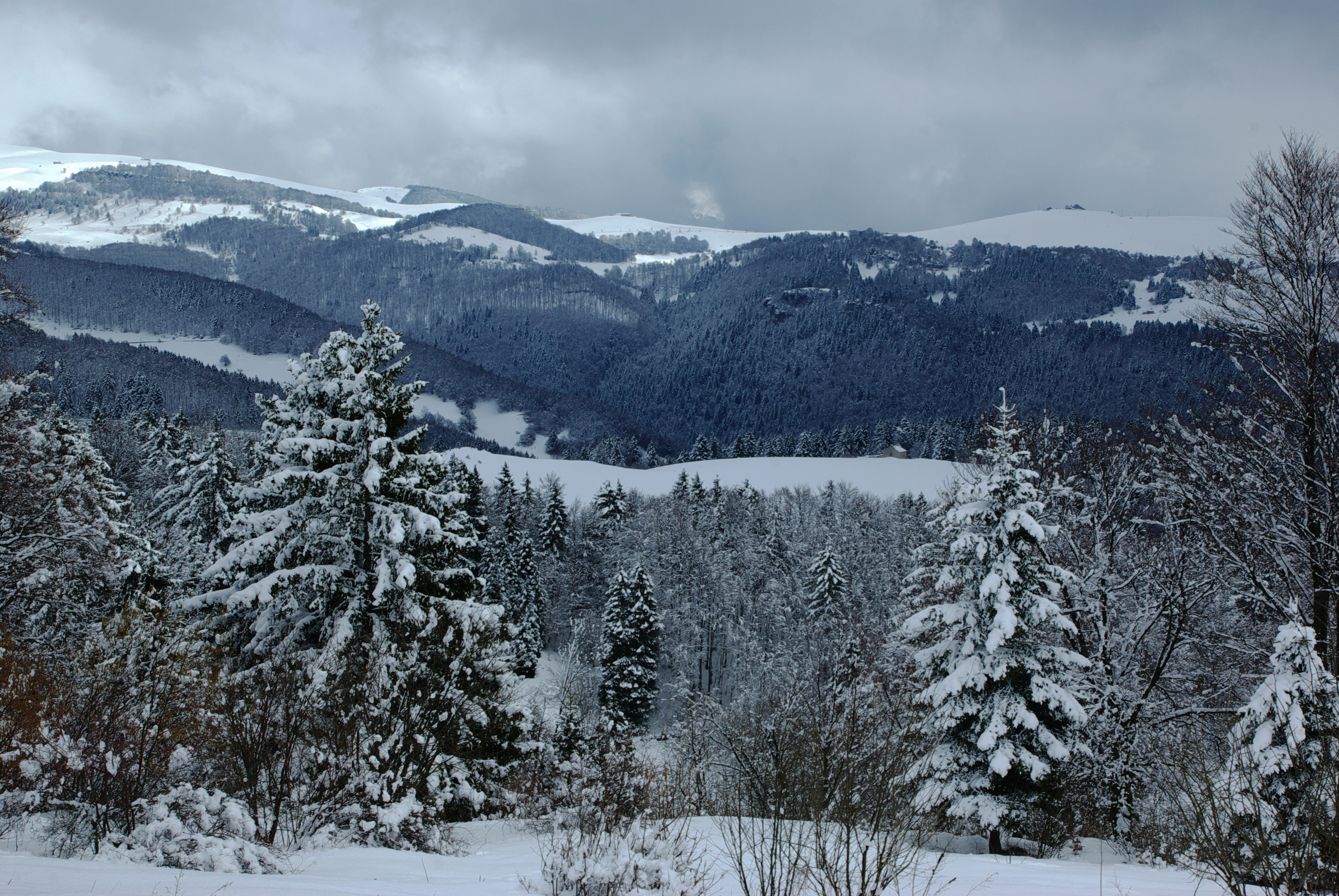
Lessinia Regional Park

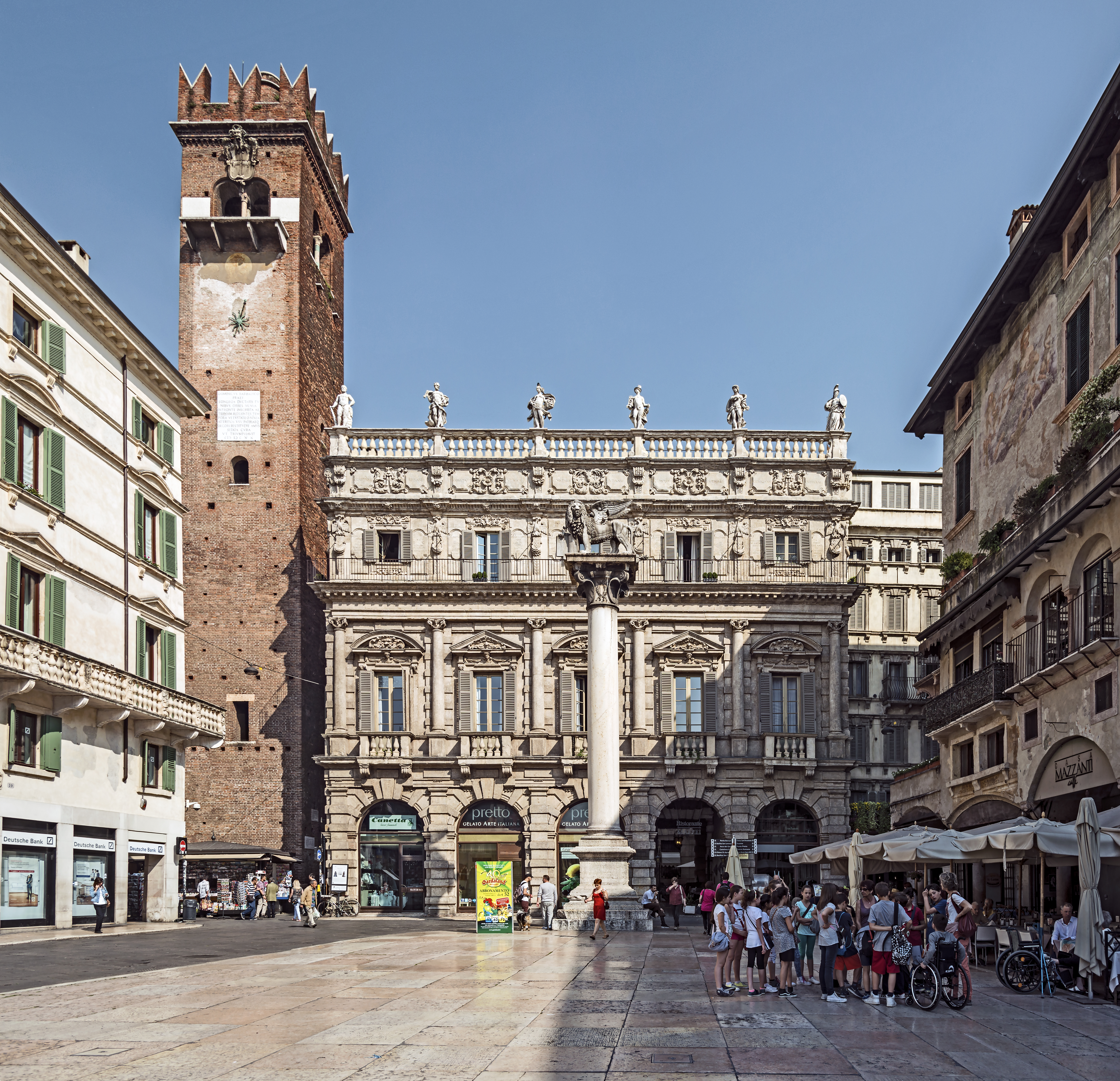
Verona

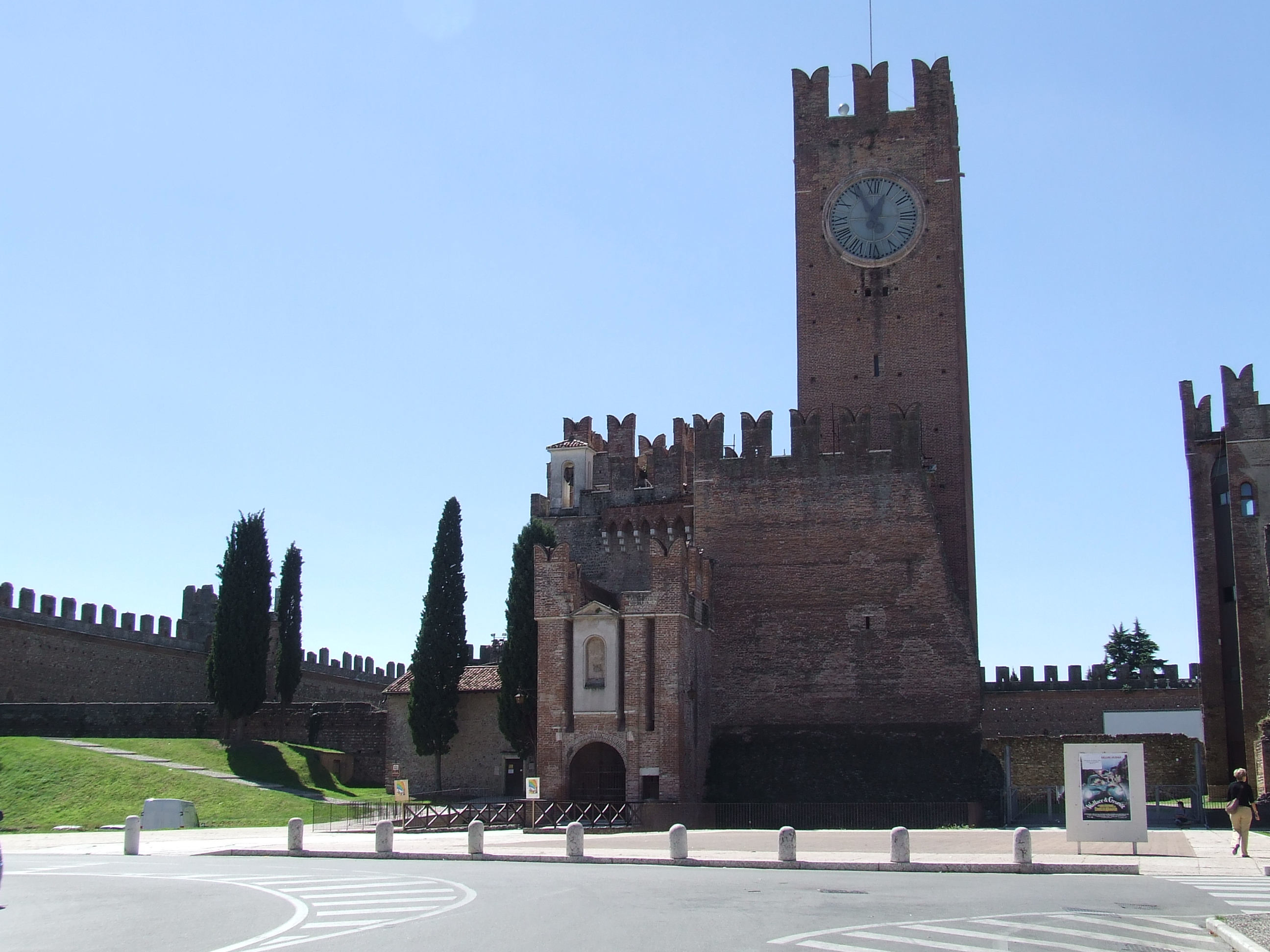
Villafranca di Verona

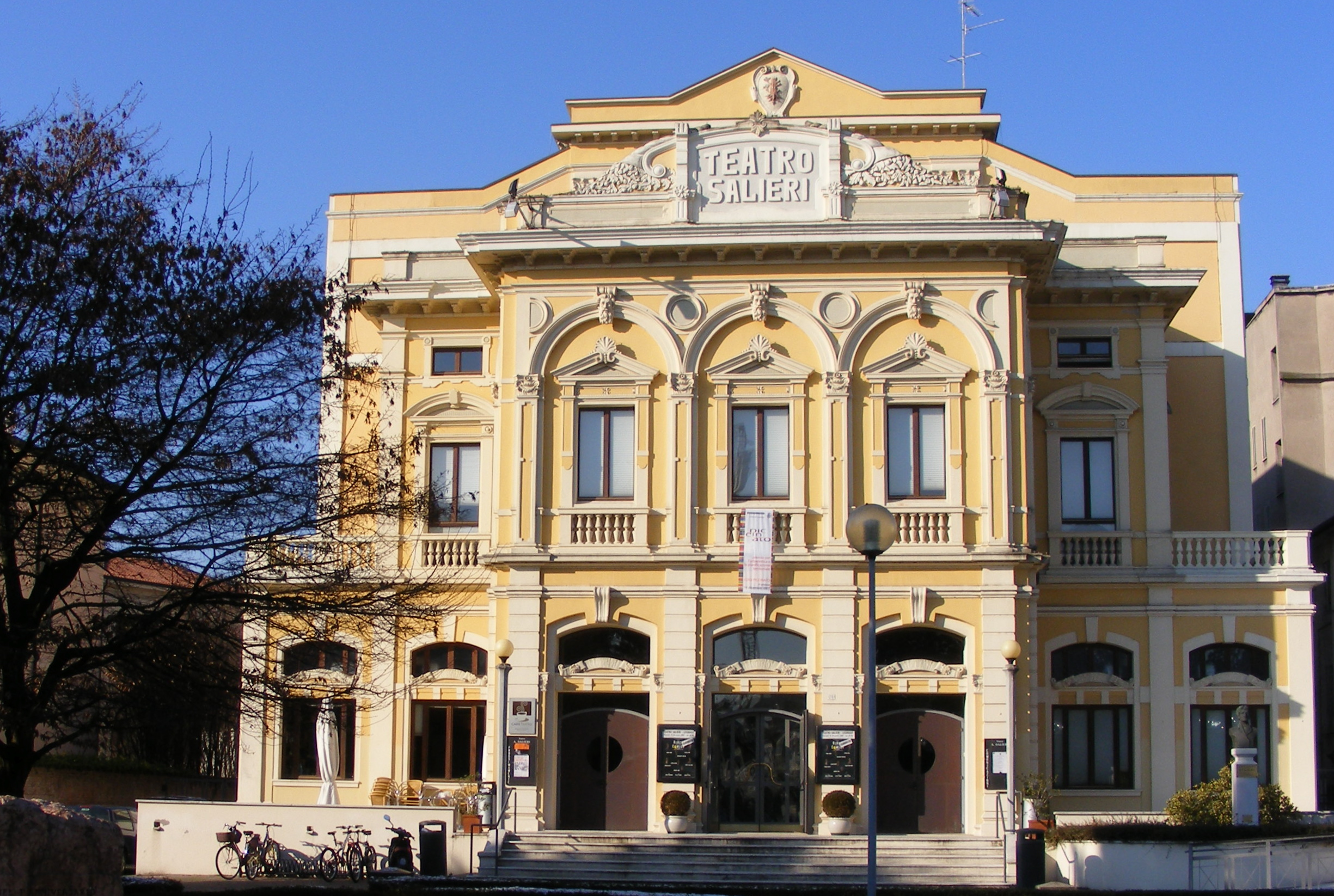
Legnago

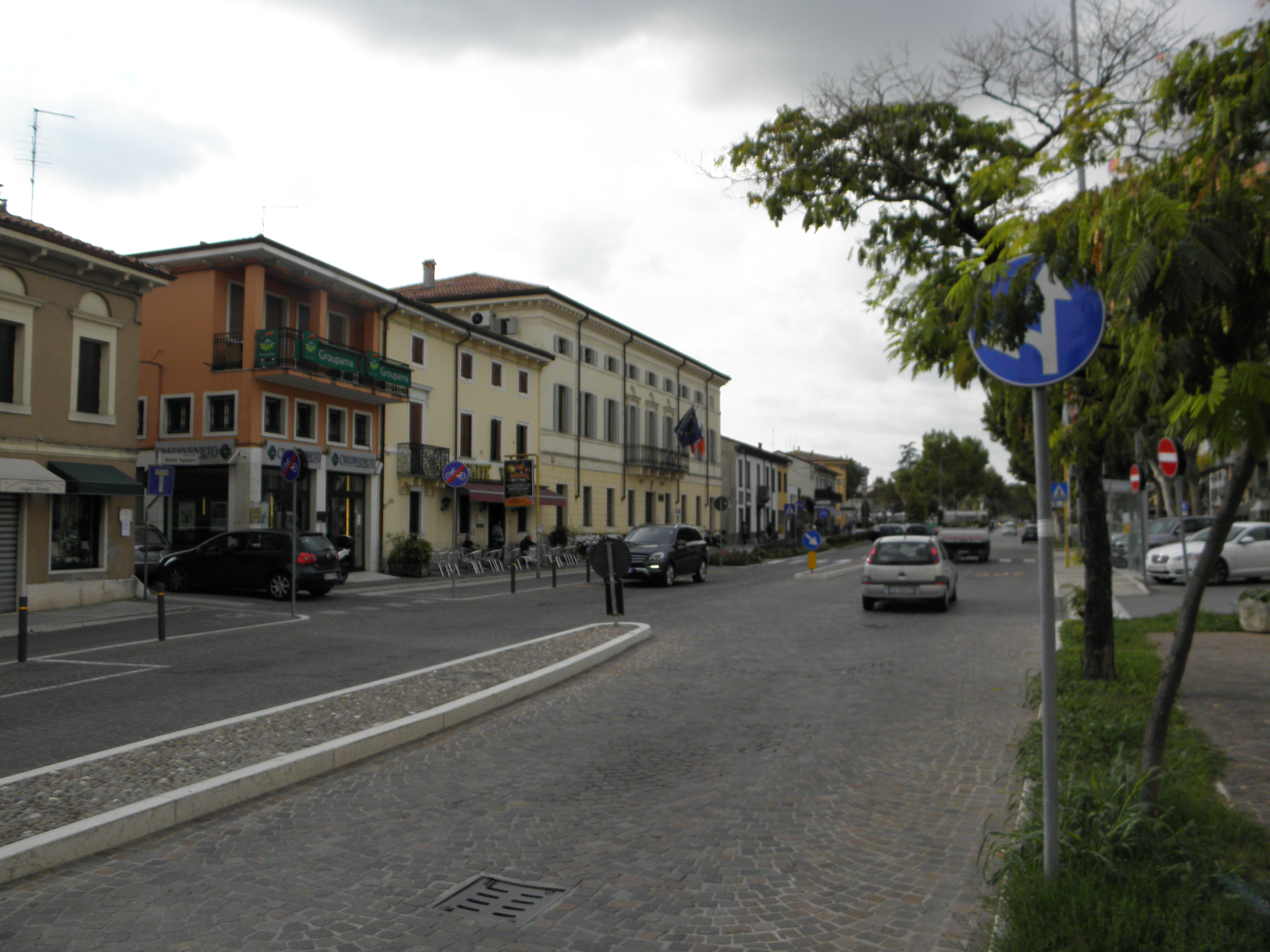
San Giovanni Lupatoto

== Demographics ==
As of 2026, the population is 930,842, of which 49.4% are male, and 50.6% are female. Minors make up 15.2% of the population, and seniors make up 23.9%.

Historical population
Year	Pop.	±%
1861	—	—
1871	372,672	—
1881	398,742	+7.0%
1901	431,586	+8.2%
1911	491,389	+13.9%
1921	538,815	+9.7%
1931	571,686	+6.1%
1936	585,893	+2.5%
1951	645,536	+10.2%
1961	667,517	+3.4%
1971	733,595	+9.9%
1981	775,745	+5.7%
1991	788,343	+1.6%
2001	826,582	+4.9%
2011	900,542	+8.9%
2021	924,024	+2.6%
Source: ISTAT

=== Immigration ===
As of 2025, immigrants make up 14.9% of the population. The five largest foreign countries of birth are Romania, Morocco, Moldova, Sri Lanka, and Albania.

== Sights ==
Due to its historic importance, the province boasts a large number of castles, towers, hermitages, monasteries, sanctuaries, and old Romanesque parishes. A regional park is located in Lessinia. Valpolicella is popular for its wines which are made from indigenous techniques. Europe's biggest natural bridge-Ponte di Veja is located in the province. The northern part of the province is mostly hilly, with several rivers, including Tartaro, Caslagnaro and Adige.

== Transport ==
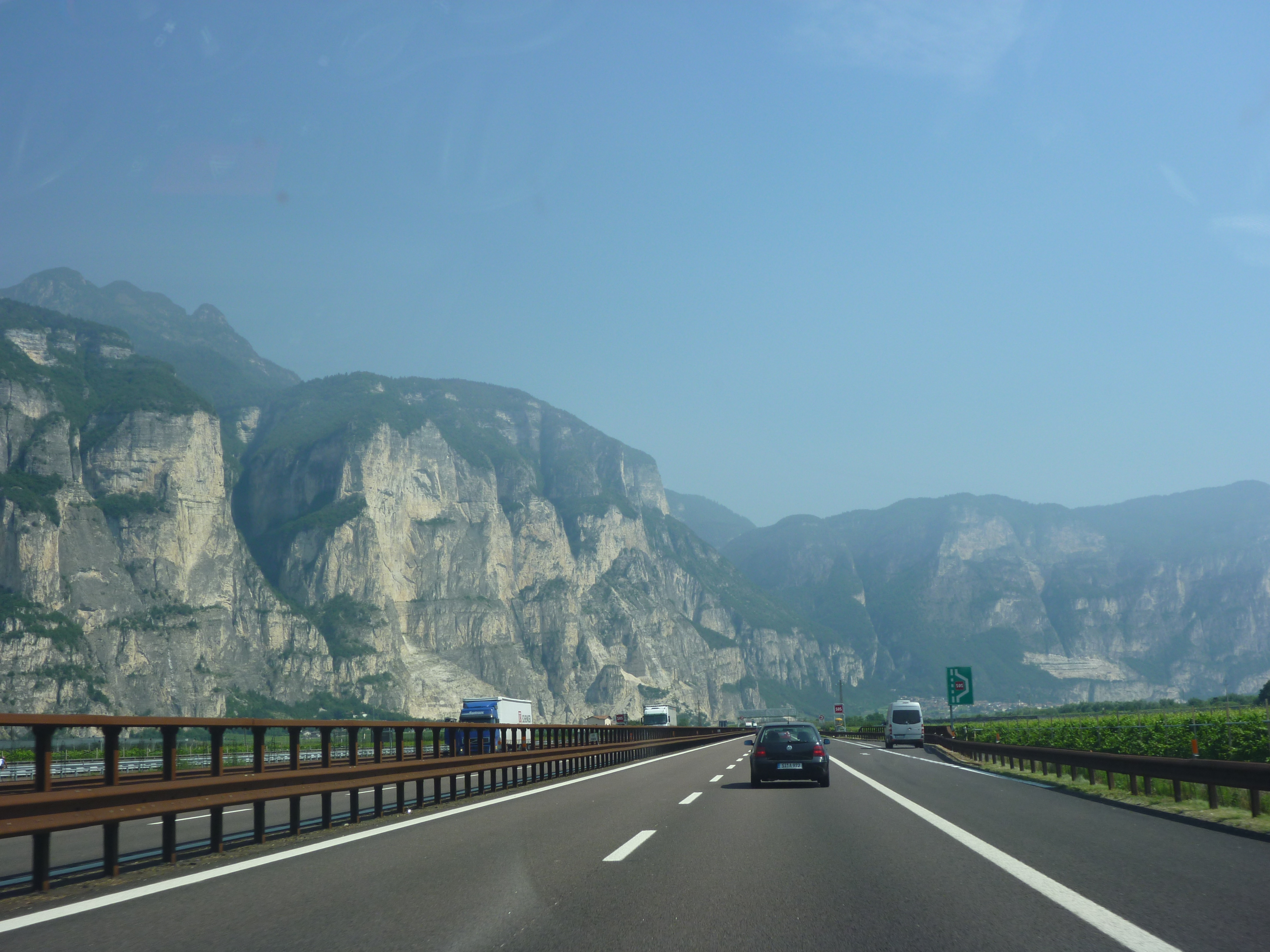
Autostrada A22 from Verona to Bolzano

=== Motorways ===
- Autostrada A4: Turin–Trieste
- Autostrada A22: Modena–Brenner Pass

=== Railway lines ===
- Milan–Venice railway
- Brenner Railway
- Verona–Bologna railway
- Verona–Rovigo railway
- Mantua–Monselice railway
- Verona–Mantua–Modena railway

=== Airports ===
- Verona Villafranca Airport
