= Casaleone =

- Comune
- Comune di Casaleone
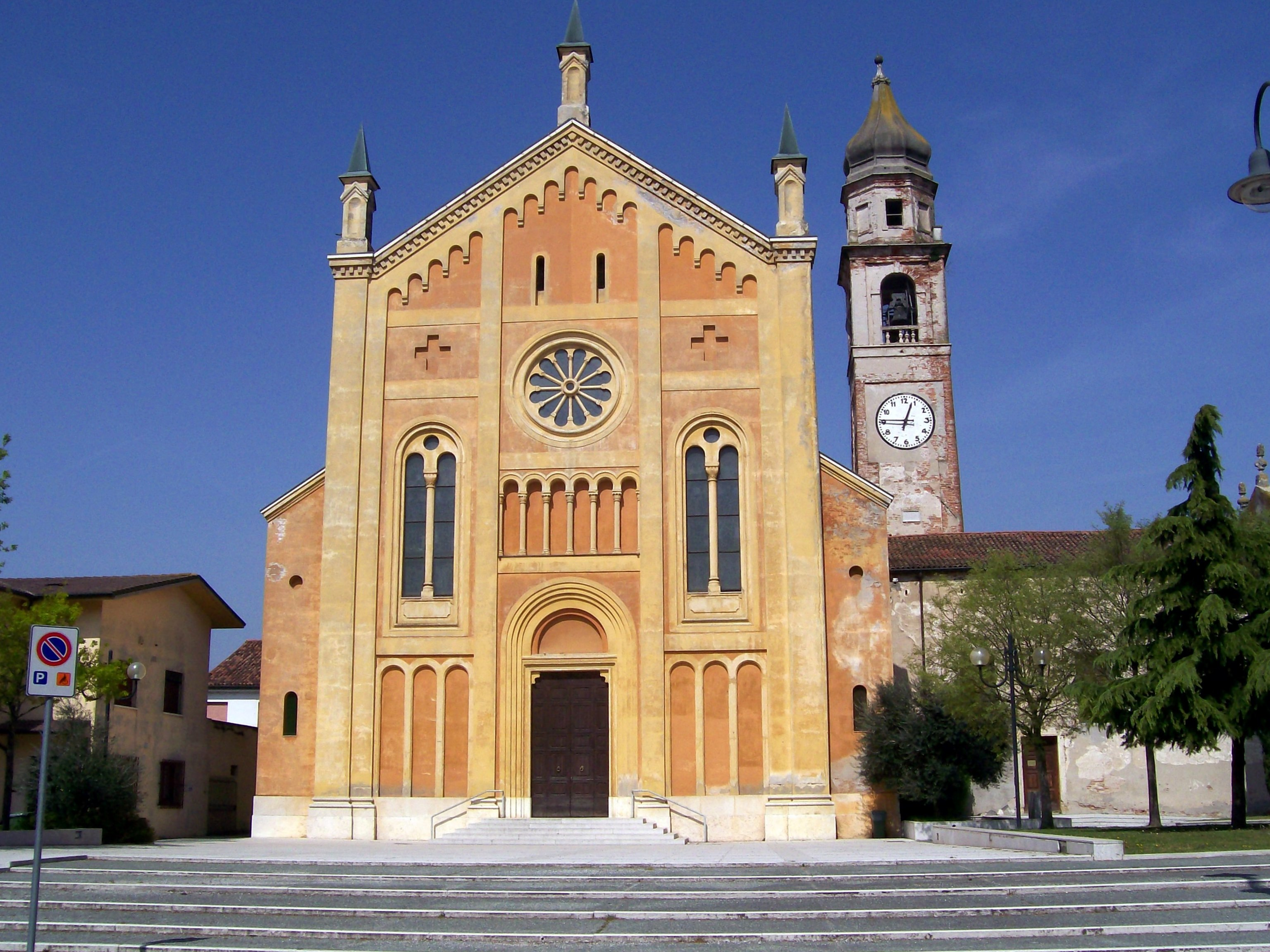

- Coat of arms

- Location within Italy Location within Veneto
- Coordinates: 45°10′N 11°12′E
- Country: Italy
- Region: Veneto
- Province: Verona (VR)
- Frazioni: Sustinenza, Venera

Government
  - Mayor: Gabriele Livio Ambrosi

Area
  - Total: 38.3 km^{2} (14.8 sq mi)
- Elevation: 16 m (52 ft)

Population (1 September 2010)
  - Total: 6,038
  - Density: 158/km^{2} (408/sq mi)
- Demonym: Casaleonesi
- Time zone: UTC+1 (CET)
  - Summer (DST): UTC+2 (CEST)
- Postal code: 37052
- Dialing code: 0442
- Patron saint: St. Blaise
- Saint day: 3 February
- Website: Official website

Casaleone (Italian pronunciation: [cazaleˈoːne]) is a comune (municipality) in the Province of Verona in the Italian region Veneto, located about 90 kilometres (56 mi) southwest of Venice and about 35 kilometres (22 mi) southeast of Verona.
