= Palù =

- Comune
- Comune di Palù
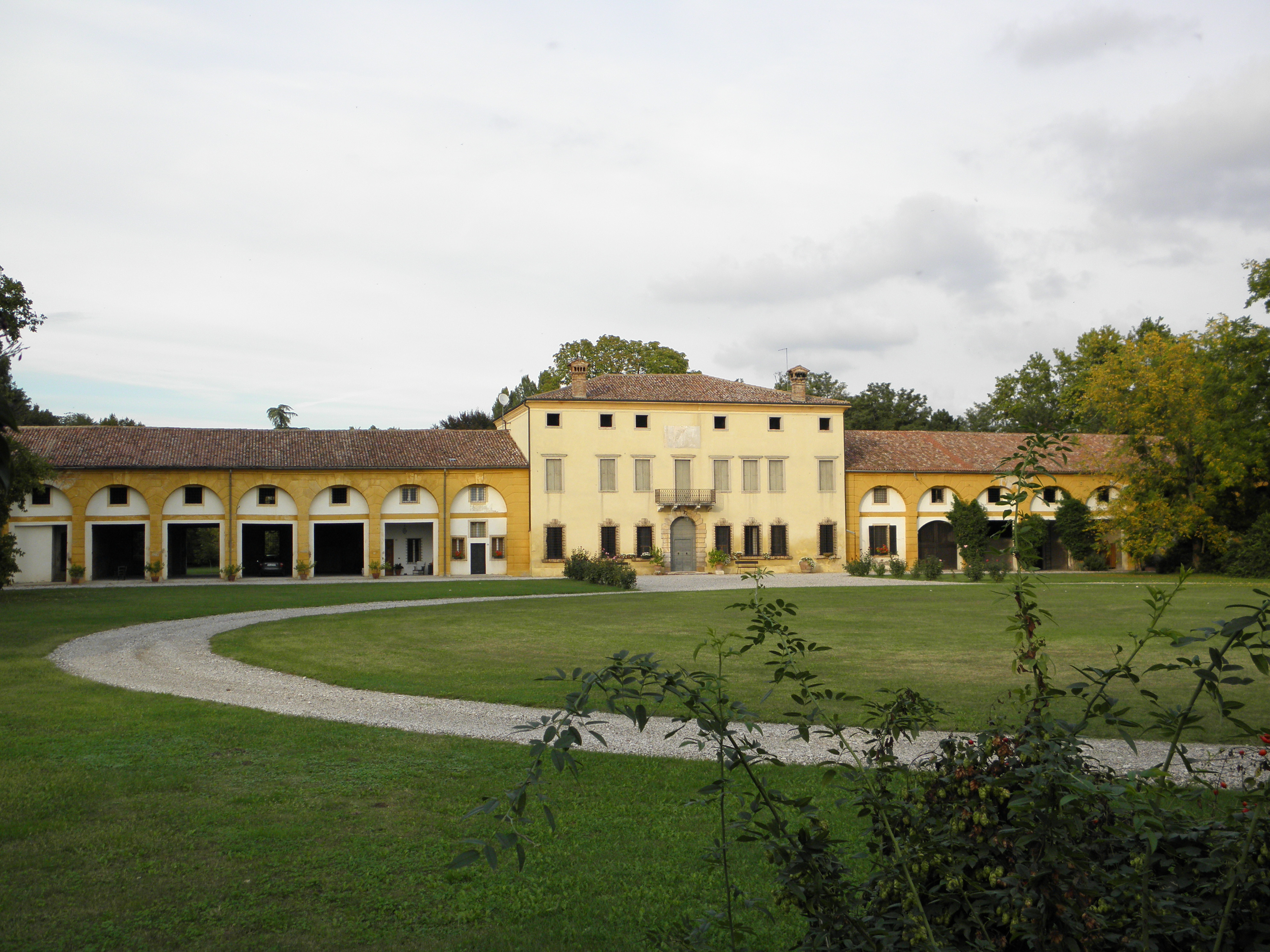
- Villa Maffei Rizzardi.

- Location within Italy Location within Veneto
- Coordinates: 45°19′N 11°9′E
- Country: Italy
- Region: Veneto
- Province: Verona (VR)

Government
  - Mayor: Gianni Brigo

Area
  - Total: 13.47 km^{2} (5.20 sq mi)
- Elevation: 25 m (82 ft)

Population (1 September 2014)
  - Total: 1,261
  - Density: 93.62/km^{2} (242.5/sq mi)
- Demonym: Palmensi
- Time zone: UTC+1 (CET)
  - Summer (DST): UTC+2 (CEST)
- Postal code: 37050
- Dialing code: 045
- Patron saint: Zeno of Verona
- Saint day: 21 May

Palù is a comune in the province of Verona in northern Italy.
