= Belfiore =

- Comune
- Comune di Belfiore
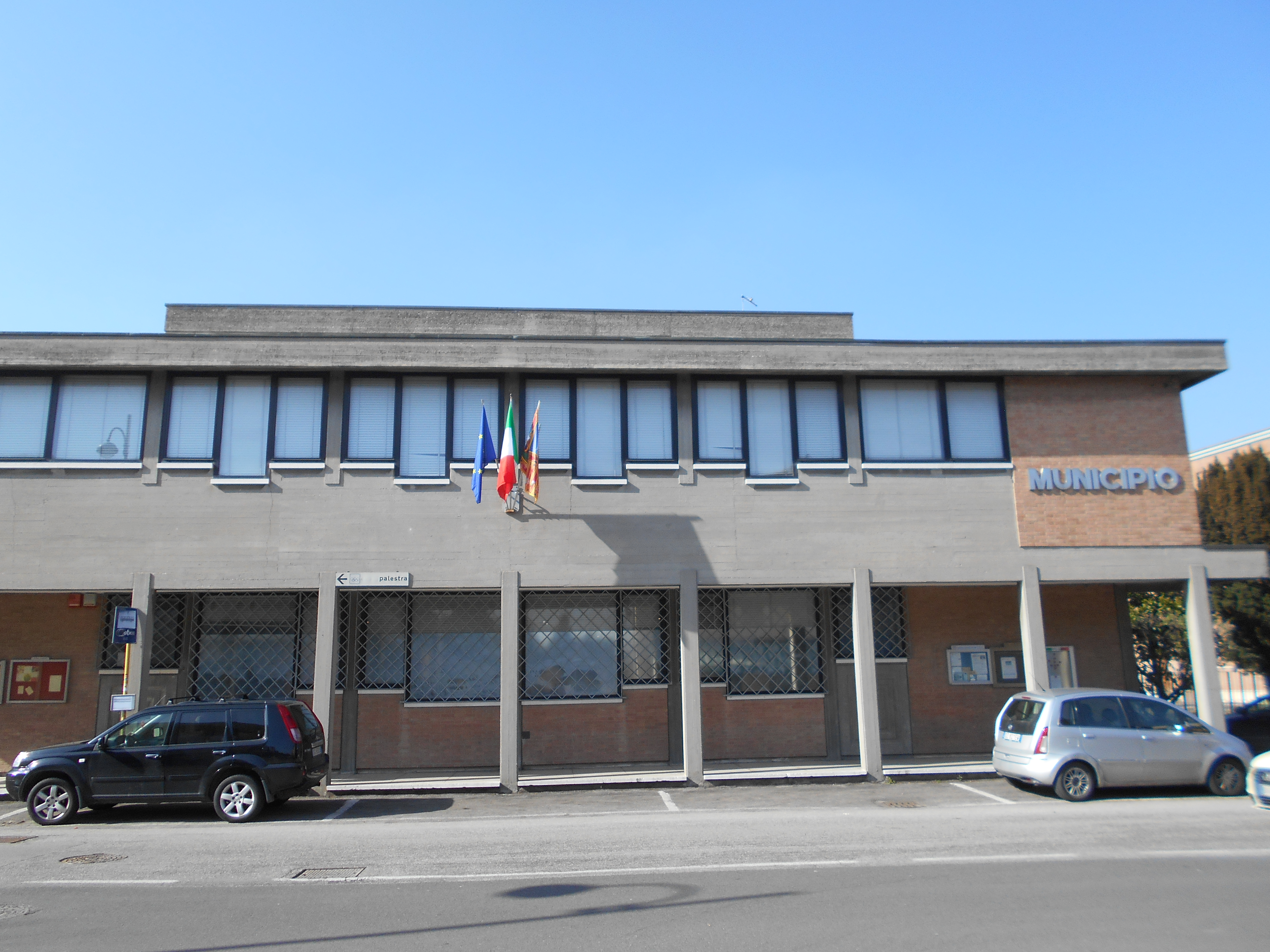
- Town hall.

- Location within Italy Location within Veneto
- Coordinates: 45°23′N 11°12′E
- Country: Italy
- Region: Veneto
- Province: Verona (VR)

Government
  - Mayor: Alessio Albertini: (PD), elected with civic list: Belfiore Domani

Area
  - Total: 26.45 km^{2} (10.21 sq mi)
- Elevation: 26 m (85 ft)

Population (31 December 2020)
  - Total: 3,219
  - Density: 121.7/km^{2} (315.2/sq mi)
- Demonym: Belfioresi
- Time zone: UTC+1 (CET)
  - Summer (DST): UTC+2 (CEST)
- Postal code: 37050
- Dialing code: 045
- Patron saint: Birth of Mary
- Saint day: 8 September
- Website: Official website

Belfiore is a comune in the province of Verona, Veneto, northern Italy.
