= October 1937 =

Month of 1937

| << | October 1937 | | | | | >> |
| Su | Mo | Tu | We | Th | Fr | Sa |
| | | | | | 1 | 2 |
| 3 | 4 | 5 | 6 | 7 | 8 | 9 |
| 10 | 11 | 12 | 13 | 14 | 15 | 16 |
| 17 | 18 | 19 | 20 | 21 | 22 | 23 |
| 24 | 25 | 26 | 27 | 28 | 29 | 30 |
| 31 |

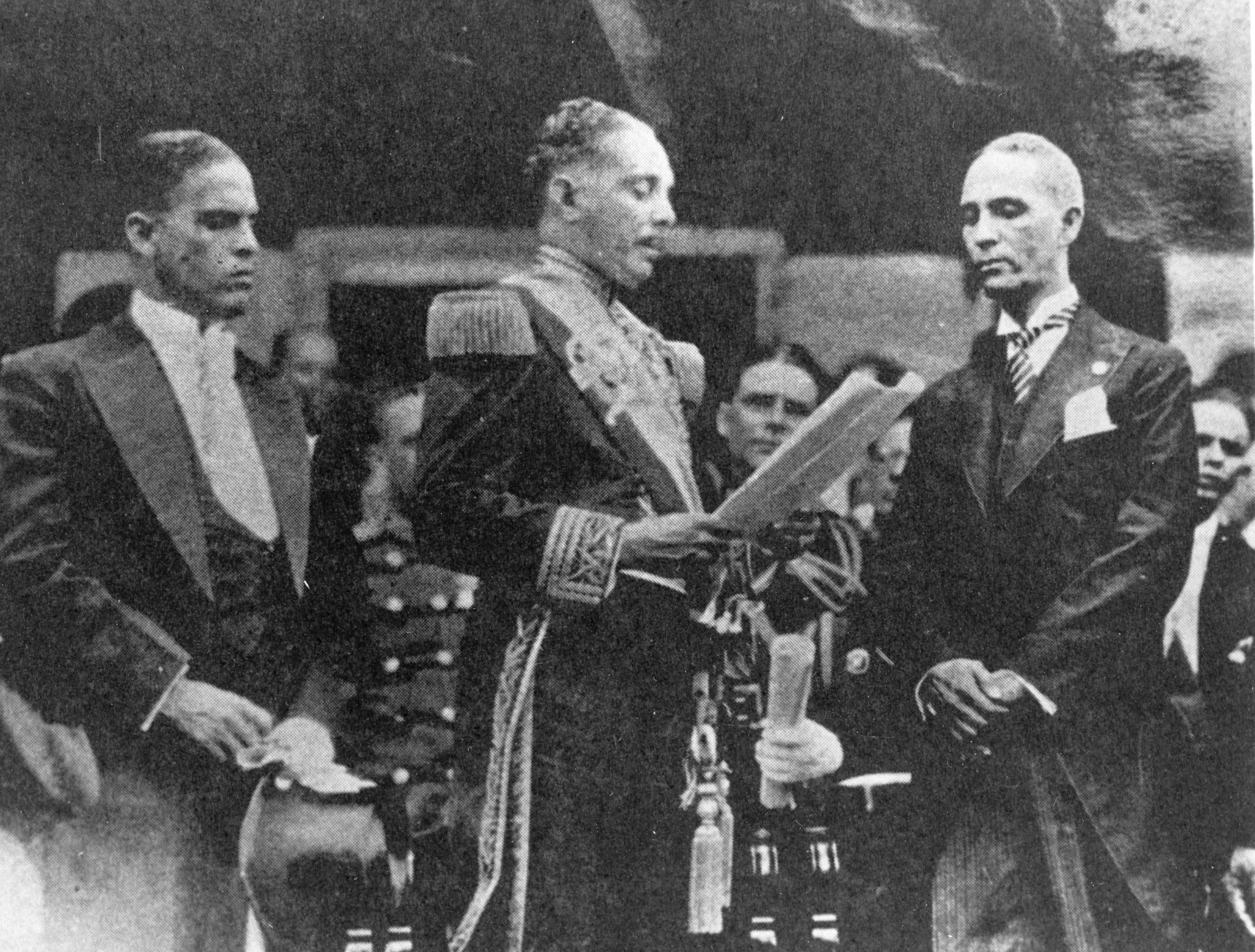
October 2, 1937: Dominican Republic's President Trujillo orders massacre of Haitian peasants, with 12,000 ultimately killed.

The following events occurred in October 1937:

== October 1, 1937 (Friday) ==
- In the British Mandate for Palestine, the British administration outlawed most Palestinian nationalist organizations in response to the assassination of Galilee district commissioner Lewis Yelland Andrews on September 26. The Arab Higher Committee, the National Bloc and the Istiqal pro-independence party were all outlawed, and members of the organizations were arrested. Yaqub al-Ghusayn, Husayin al-Khalidi and Ahmed Hilmi Pasha were deported to the remote Seychelles islands.
- U.S. Supreme Court Justice Hugo Black gave a radio address admitting that he had once been a member of the Ku Klux Klan, but had resigned and never rejoined. Black repudiated the Klan and pointed out that his voting record in the Senate demonstrated that he was "of that group of liberal senators who have consistently fought for the civil, economic and religious rights of all Americans, without regard to race or creed."
- The Federal Court of India began operations at Delhi in British India with Sir Maurice Gwyer as the first Chief Justice, and natives Sir Shah Muhammad Sulaiman and M. R. Jayakar as the two associate justices.

== October 2, 1937 (Saturday) ==
- The massacre of at least 12,000 migrants from Haiti began in the Dominican Republic and Haiti, when Dominican President Rafael Trujillo made an inflammatory speech at Dajabon accusing Haitian migrants of stealing cattle and produce from Dominican farmers. Trujillo proclaimed, "To the Dominicans who were complaining of the depradations by Haitians living among them, thefts of cattle, provisions and fruits... I have responded 'I will fix this'... 300 Haitians are now dead in Banica. This remedy will continue." The campaign is referred to as the "Parsley Massacre" because the method used by the army to determine whether a peasant was of Haitian descent was by asking the victim to pronounce "perejil", the Spanish word for parsley. Ultimately, a list was compiled 12,168 known victims who were killed by soldiers and civilians during the six days before Trujillo ordered a halt to the killing on October 8.
- In Spain, General Franco's Nationalists captured Covadonga.
- Ronald Reagan made his screen debut with the release of the film Love Is on the Air, also starring June Travis.
- The first of 107 recorded deaths in the U.S. from the toxic sulfanalamide elixir when 8-year-old John King, Jr. of Tulsa, Oklahoma, died in a hospital from "influenza and a kidney ailment" that had developed September 24. Three days later, Millard Wakeford Jr., 5, died from "a streptocuss throat inspection which spread to his kidneys, followed two days later by a 6-year-old boy's death.
- Born:
  - Johnnie Cochran, American lawyer; in Shreveport, Louisiana (d. 2005)
  - Roberto Herlitzka, Italian actor; in Turin. (d. 2024)

== October 3, 1937 (Sunday) ==
- Samuel R. Caldwell and Moses Baca became the first Americans to be arrested under the U.S. Marihuana Stamp Tax Act of 1937, which had gone into effect two days earlier before Both arrests were carried out in Denver, Colorado. Caldwell, who was not a marijuana user, was caught selling three joints to a buyer, Claude Morgan, and a search of his hotel room found additional cannabis; he was sentenced to four years in federal prison for drug trafficking. Baca, picked up at his apartment at 3:15 in the morning for beating his wife after becoming drunk, was charged with the additional crime of possession after police searched his apartment and found 1/4 ounce of cannabis and sentenced to 14 months in prison. Since possession and selling of marijuana itself was not punishable as a federal crime, the arrests were made for having the cannabis without having proof of paying the new federal tax on the product.
- An estimated 2,000 members of the British Union of Fascists, led by Sir Oswald Mosley marched through the London district of Bermondsey to mark the fifth anniversary of the organization's founding. Anti-fascists jeered and threw eggs, bricks and other objects as 3,000 police fought to maintain order during the riot, and 111 arrests were made.
- In the U.S., The Old Fashioned Revival Hour, a Christian evangelical radio program, premiered on the Mutual Broadcasting System, with Charles E. Fuller, beginning a 31-year run (on Mutual and then on ABC Radio) that ended in 1968 after Fuller's death.
- Soviet Communist Party official Iosif Vareikis, who had questioned General Secretary Joseph Stalin about the arrest and execution of Marshal Mikhail Tukhachevsky and been summoned to return to the Kremlin, was arrested when his train arrived at Moscow. Vareikis would be executed less than a year later, on July 29, 1938.
- As part of the Great Purge in the Soviet Union, German Communists Hans Kippenberger and Willy Leow, and Soviet Georgian artist Benito Buachidze were executed by gunshot in the Soviet Union for being members of a "counter-revolutionary" organization.
- Died:
  - Richard Hertwig, 87, German zoologist
  - E. J. Rapson, 76, British numismatist, philologist and professor of the Sanskrit language.

== October 4, 1937 (Monday) ==
- In the Madras Province of British India, a passive resistance campaign was launched against the Hindu-dominated provincial government by the province's Muslim minority speakers of the Urdu language, in resistance to the August 11 proposal to make teaching of the Hindi language mandatory in all schools. Newspaper publisher Periyar (Erode Venkatappa Ramasamy) and Justice Party leader A. T. Panneerselvam convened the "Anti-Hindi " conference and agreed on a resistance campaign with peaceful protest marches, black flag demonstrations, and fasting to prevent the Hindi education order proposed by Premier Chakravarti Rajagopalachari.
- In the Canadian province of Alberta, the "Accurate News and Information Act" passed the provincial legislature. The Act, introduced by the government of Premier William Aberhart, setting up a committee of legislators from the Social Credit Party, who would have authority to require newspapers in the province to revise any articles deemed to be inaccurate, to reveal unidentified sources on demand, and providing for criminal penalties for failure to cooperate. The Act never took effect, because the province's lieutenant governor declined to give royal assent until the Act could be reviewed by the Supreme Court of Canada, which ultimately found the proposed law to be unconstitutional.
- A submarine of unknown origin fired a torpedo at the British destroyer HMS Basilisk as it patrolled the Mediterranean, the first such attack since the Nyon agreement went into effect. The torpedo missed its target and the Basilisk countered by dropping depth charges, to unknown effect.
- Born:
  - Jackie Collins, English novelist with 32 best sellers; in Hampstead, London (d. 2015)
  - Franz Vranitzky, Chancellor of Austria from 1986 to 1997; in Vienna
  - Pahlad Ramsurrun, Mauritian author of 70 books and editor of the literary journal Indradhanush; at Amaury.

== October 5, 1937 (Tuesday) ==
- In Chicago, U.S. President Franklin D. Roosevelt made the controversial "Quarantine Speech", describing war as a "contagion" and calling for an international "quarantine" of aggressor nations.
- In a bout in French Algeria, French boxer Maurice Holtzer defeated Phil Dolhem is a 15-round decision to win the world featherweight championship of the International Boxing Union.
- The handwritten "Ben-Gurion letter", which is of historical interest to researchers because of Zionist leader David Ben-Gurion's views of treatment of Palestinian Arabs, was written by Ben-Gurion to his son, Amos. Ben-Gurion, who would become the first Prime Minister of Israel in 1948, with a dispute on whether he crossed out a section saying "We must expel Arabs and take their places" or "We must not expel the Arabs".
- Born:
  - Barry Switzer, American college football and professional football coach, known for winning three NCAA college football championships (1974, 1975 and 1985) while at the University of Oklahoma, and the NFL's Super Bowl XXX for the Dallas Cowboys in the 1995 season; in Crossett, Arkansas
  - Premasara Epasinghe, Sri Lankan broadcaster known for being that nation's commentator on cricket match broadcasts; in Colombo, British Ceylon
- Died: Frank Stephens, 88, the first Director of the San Diego Natural History Museum, died 10 days after being struck by a street car.

== October 6, 1937 (Wednesday) ==
- The U.S. radio talk show Hobby Lobby, described by a columnist as "a novel form of radio entertainment", hosted by comedian Dave Elman, premiered in the evening on the CBS Radio network. with a time slot of 7:15 to 8:15 in the east, and 9:30 to 10:00 in the central time zone. With a guest co-host each week (starting with Admiral Richard E. Byrd on the first show), Elman interviewed members of the American public who had unusual hobbies.
- Italy sent three new squadrons of Savoia-Marchetti SM.79 bombers to assist the Nationalists in Spain.
- Legislative elections were held in the Canadian province of Ontario. The Liberal Party led by Premier Mitchell Hepburn, retained its majority.
- Born:
  - Emilio Isgrò, Italian artist; in Barcellona Pozzo di Gotto
  - Renato Capecchi, Italian-born American geneticist and 2007 Nobel Prize laureate; in Verona (d. 1998).
- Died: Angelo Musco, 65, Italian actor.

== October 7, 1937 (Thursday) ==
- A Spanish Nationalist court-martial declared death for the captured mercenary American pilot Harold Edward Dahl, but the sentence was immediately annulled by a reprieve.
- The U.S. magazine Woman's Day was first published.
- Born: Chet Powers, American singer-songwriter; in Danbury, Connecticut (d. 1994)
- Died:
  - Renate Müller, 31, German singer and actress was killed when she fell or jumped from a window.
  - Henry Roland, 43, German-born American stunt performer, fell to his death during a performance

== October 8, 1937 (Friday) ==
- The family of American greeting card executive Charles S. Ross, who had been kidnapped on September 25 by John Henry Seadlund and James Atwood Gray, paid Seadlund a ransom of $50,000 (equivalent to $1.1 million in 2025) for Ross's release. Rather than releasing Ross, Seadlund shot and killed both Ross and Gray two days later. Seadlund would be arrested three months later on federal charges of kidnapping, found guilty, and executed in the electric chair on July 14, 1938.
- The Foreign Ministry of Germany instructed its General Consulate in Lebanon that Germany would not provide weapons or ammunition to Palestinian Arabs to use against the British Mandate for Palestine, which would later become the nation of Israel.
- The Japanese reported the capture of Chengtingfu along the Beiping-Hankou Railway in Hebei Province.
- Died:
  - Nisar Muhammad Yousafzai, 40, Afghan communist instrumental in the creation of the Soviet Union republic that is now Tajikistan, and the People's Commissar for Education in the Tajik SSR since 1926, was killed on the same day his arrest after getting into an altercation during interrogation.
  - Grigory Ivanovich Semyonov, 45, former intelligence agent for the Soviet Union's NKVD, was executed by gunshot immediately after being convicted on charges of "participation in a counter-revolutionary terrorist organization".
  - Sergey Klychkov, 48, Soviet Russian novelist, was killed by an interrogator at Lefortovo Prison after being arrested on charges of having been a terrorist.
  - Jeanne Demarsy (stage name for Anne Darlaud), 72, French actress and model for impressionist artists, known as the subject of Édouard Manet's 1881 painting Jeanne and Pierre-Auguste Renoir's 1882 portrait Mademoiselle Demarsy.
  - Theodor Alt, 91, German painter

== October 9, 1937 (Saturday) ==
- At Angel Falls in Venezuela, at 3,212 feet (979 m) the world's tallest uninterrupted waterfall, American explorer Jimmie Angel, (for whom the falls are named), attempted to land his airplane on level ground on the Auyán-tepui mountain where the falls originate. Angel made a successful landing along with his wife and two other companions, but were stranded when the monoplane, El Rio Caroni, got stuck when its wheels sank in the marshy ground. They spent the next 11 days descending Auyán-tepui by foot. The airplane itself would not be removed until 1970.
- As the Great Purge continued, Alexander Samoylovich, a leading anthropologist for the Russian Academy of Sciences and Director of its Institute of Oriental Studies since 1934, was arrested in Kislovodsk by the Soviet NKVD secret police and on false charges of espionage for Japan and creating a "counter-revolutionary" nationalist organization of Turkic peoples, particularly in what are now the nations of Uzbekistan, Azerbaijan, Turkmenistan, Kyrgyzstan and Tajikistan. He was executed four months later, on February 13, 1938, and exonerated posthumously in 1956 after the death of Joseph Stalin.
- Benito Mussolini turned down an invitation from Britain and France to attend a conference on the question of foreign volunteers in Spain.
- Born: Frank Cignetti Sr., American college football coach and inductee to the College Football Hall of Fame; in Apollo, Pennsylvania (d.2022)
- Died:
  - Ernst Ludwig of Hesse-Darmstadt, 68, the last Grand Duke of Hesse, from 1892 until the abolition of the German monarchy in 1918
  - Percy Stout, 61, English rugby union player for the England national team in 1898 and 1899

== October 10, 1937 (Sunday) ==
- The New York Yankees won the World Series for the second straight year, four games to one, with a 4–2 defeat of the New York Giants
- Sir Oswald Mosley, the British Fascist leader, was knocked unconscious by a stone that struck him in the head when he stood on a truck to address a Fascist rally in Liverpool.
- Born:
  - George W. Strawbridge, Jr., American investor and heir to the Campbell Soup Company fortune, later the owner of the Buffalo Sabres NHL ice hockey team and the Tampa Bay Rowdies professional soccer team; in Philadelphia
  - Peter Underwood, British-born Australian jurist and politician who served on the Supreme Court of Tasmania from 1984 to 2008 as Governor of Tasmania from 2008 to 2014 (d. 2014)
  - Danny Kaleikini, American Hawaiian singer and entertainer known as "The Ambassador of Aloha"; in Honolulu, Territory of Hawaii (d.2023)
- Died:
  - Peter of Krutitsy, 75, Metropolitan and leader of the Russian Orthodox Church from 1925 to 1936, and a political prisoner since 1930, was executed by shooting
  - Ivan Kulyk, 40, Soviet Ukrainian Communist and Chairman of the Ukrainian SSR Union of Writers, was executed by shooting in Kiev.

== October 11, 1937 (Monday) ==
- The Duke of Windsor and his wife began a visit to Nazi Germany, arriving at Berlin Friedrichstraße station by train from Paris. The Duke was taken on a tour of a factory by German Labour Front leader Robert Ley.
- Charles Lindbergh and wife Anne began their second visit to Nazi Germany. Over the next two weeks Colonel Lindbergh would be shown the Focke-Wulf, Henschel and Daimler-Benz factories and permitted to examine the Dornier Do 17 bomber and Messerschmitt Bf 109 fighter.
- The U.S. Supreme Court decided the case Ex parte Levitt, overruling a legal challenge made by lawyer Albert Levitt a week earlier in an attempt to bar newly confirmed associate justice Hugo Black from taking his seat on the bench.
- U.S. President Franklin D. Roosevelt received Vittorio Mussolini, son of Italian dictator Benito Mussolini, at the White House. Vittorio, a well-known cinephile, was coming back from a visit to Hollywood studios.
- Born:
  - Bobby Charlton, English footballer with 106 caps for the England national team and 606 games for Manchester United; in Ashington, Northumberland (d. 2023)
  - Ron Leibman, American stage, film and TV actor; winner of the Prime Time Emmy Award for Best Actor in 1979 for the TV series Kaz, and the 1993 Tony Award for Outstanding Actor for Angels in America in 1993; in Manhattan, New York City (d. 2019)

== October 12, 1937 (Tuesday) ==
- Malayan Airways Ltd, a predecessor to both Malaysia Airlines and Singapore Airlines, was founded as a competitor to Wearnes Air Services for flights between sites British Malaya (now Malaysia and Singapore, as a joint venture of Straits Steamship Company Limited, Ocean Steamship Company and Imperial Airways.
- In the continuing Great Purge, Yakov Yakovlev, the Soviet Commissar of Agriculture from 1929 to 1934, and the recently appointed leader of the Communist Party of Byelorussia, was arrested, as was his wife Sofia Sokolovskaya, a director of the Soviet film agency Mosfilm. The two were arrested separately, with Sokolovskaya implicating her husband in anti-Soviet activities. Both would be executed in 1938.
- France and Yugoslavia extended their mutual assistance pact of 1927 for an additional five years.
- U.S. President Franklin D. Roosevelt gave a fireside chat on the topic of legislation to be recommended to Congress.
- Born:
  - Kerry Sibraa, Australian senator for New South Wales from the Australian Labor Party, who served as President of the Australian Senate from 1987 to 1994; in Sydney
  - Jim McKrell, American actor and game show host, known for Celebrity Sweepstakes; in Little Rock, Arkansas
- Died:
  - Al Brady, 26, American criminal designated by the FBI as "Public Enemy No. 1" after the death of John Dillinger, was killed along with Clarence Lee Shaffer Jr., in a gun battle in Bangor, Maine, by FBI agents, who had been waiting for Brady, Shaffer and James Dalhover to appear at Dakin's Sporting Goods Store to pick up an order of Thompson submachine guns.
  - Maximilian Kravkov, 50, Soviet Russian explorer and author known for his journeys through Siberia, was executed by a gunshot to the head at a Siberian prison camp, five months after his arrest on false charges of espionage for Japan.
  - Alceo Dossena, 59, Italian sculptor and presumed forger

== October 13, 1937 (Wednesday) ==
- Germany sent a note to Belgium guaranteeing that Belgian neutrality would be respected as long as it refrained from military action against Germany. Specifically, the carefully worded message noted that the German government had taken note of Belgium's "policy of independence" in staying neutral, and the kingdom's "determination to defend the frontiers of Belgium with all its forces against aggression or invasion", adding "The German Government...confirms its determination that in no circumstances" would it impair the "inviolability and integrity" of Belgium's and would "at all times respect Belgian territory except, of course, in the event of Belgium's taking part in a military action against Germany..." Germany would invade Belgium on May 11, 1940, and complete its conquest in less than three weeks.
- The Soviet Union's BT-5 light tank made a disastrous debut in combat, appearing for the Spanish Second Republic in the battle of Fuentes de Ebro in the Zaragoza Offensive in the Spanish Civil War. A combination of crews from the Soviets' 5th Kalinovsky Mechanized Corps and from the 14th International Brigade made a poorly planned assault before noon. Of 48 tanks in the "International Tank Regiment", 19 were lost in a single day, and a third of the tank crews were killed or wounded.
- The United States Federal Communications Commission adopted its frequency allocations for television broadcasting, with seven channels between 44 MHz and 108 MHz (now occupied by VHF channels 2, 3, 4, 5 and 6), and 12 future channels from 156 to 194 MHz (now VHF 7, 8, 9 and 10)
- Mykhailo Bondarenko, who had taken office less than six weeks earlier (on August 30) as the Chairman of the Council of People's Commissars of the Ukrainian SSR in the Soviet Union (equivalent to the republic's prime minister), was arrested after being summoned to Moscow, and charged with belonging to an "anti-Soviet Trotskyist terrorist and sabotage organization". He was executed as part of Stalin's Great Purge on February 10, 1938. Bondarenko was replaced by Mykola Marchak, who would be arrested on June 20, 1938 and executed later in the year.
- In Rome, the Special Tribunal for the Defense of the State sentenced the antifascist members of the Centro Interno Socialista, Rodolfo Morandi, Aligi Sassu and four other defendants were condemned to ten years of prison.
- American actor and singer Leonard Slye signed a long-term contract with Republic Studios for a salary of $75 a week to appear in Republic's B-movie westerns. Slye's was given the stage name of "Dick Weston" for his first role soon after for Wild Horse Rodeo, but would be billed the next year under the name he would become most famous for, and which would become his legal name in 1942, Roy Rogers.
- Died:
  - Pyotr Averyanov, 70, Chief of the General Staff of the Imperial Russian Army for the Tsar Nicholas II from 1916 to 1917, died in exile in Yugoslavia.
  - Ahmad Javad, 45, Soviet Azerbaijani poet; Bekir Çoban-zade, 44, Soviet Tatar linguist and Dmitrii Milev, 50, Soviet Bessarabian author were all executed by gunshot after being accused and convicted of the "anti-Soviet" organizing of minorities

== October 14, 1937 (Thursday) ==
- Amin al-Husseini, the Grand Mufti of Jerusalem, disguised as a Bedouin and evading a warrant for his arrest in the British Mandate, fled from Jerusalem to Jaffa, where he reconstituted the committee under his leadership.
- A total of seven people were killed in a day of violence in Palestine. Three were killed when a mine blew up a train northeast of the Palestinian city of Jaffa. A policeman shot two Arabs who refused to halt near the scene of the explosion. Elsewhere, two attacks on buses killed two Arabs and wounded three Jews.
- Died: Karl Bauman, 45, Latvian Communist who had served as Director of Science for the Soviet Communist Party's Central Committee, died of injuries two days after his arrest during the "Latvian Operation", purging Latvian people from the Soviet Communist Party.

== October 15, 1937 (Friday) ==
- The Japanese puppet state known as the North Shanxi Autonomous Government was installed in China's Shanxi Province, with a capital at Datong, and governed on behalf of the Japanese Empire by local politician Xia Gong.
- The Montreux Convention Regarding the Abolition of the Capitulations in Egypt, eliminating the practice of having foreigners' cases in Egypt decided in "consular courts" rather than local courts, went into effect.
- The Ernest Hemingway novel To Have and Have Not was published and introduced by Charles Scribner's Sons, as an expansion of Hemingway's 1934 Cosmopolitan magazine story "One Trip Across".
- The musical drama film Heidi starring Shirley Temple and Jean Hersholt was released.
- Born:
  - Linda Lavin, American singer and actress, known for starring in the TV series Alice; in Portland, Maine (d. 2024)
  - Giovanni Rana, Italian pasta maker; in Cologna Veneta
  - I. K. Sarma, Indian archaeologist; in Palipadu, Madras Province (now Andhra Pradesh), British India (d.2013)
- Died:
  - "Mysterious Billy Smith", 66, Canadian boxer who held the world welterweight championship from 1892 to 1894 and from 1898 to 1900"
  - Renato Paresce, 51, Italian painter
  - Pamphylia Tanailidi, 46, Soviet Azerbaijani actress, was executed after a 15-minute trial on charges of espionage.
  - Evgen Gvaladze, 37, Soviet Georgian liberation activist, was shot after being convicted of terrorism for his membership in the Tetri Giorgi organization. "Gvaladze, Eugene (Geno), by A. Mikaberidze, in: Dictionary of Georgian National Biography

== October 16, 1937 (Saturday) ==
- Officials of the Soviet Union transported the 1,116 inmates of the Solovki prison camp from the prison's island in the White Sea, to the Russian mainland, where they became the first of thousands of political prisoners to be executed at the Sandarmokh shooting grounds. The first executions were carried out 11 days later, on October 27, 1937.
- One of the United Kingdom's worst public health disasters, an outbreak of typhoid fever that would kill 43 people residents of Croydon, Surrey, near London, began when the borough's water company inadvertently began pumping unfiltered and unchlorinated water into the city's water supply. The first of 341 cases of typhoid would be reported 11 days later, on October 27, 1937.
- Born:
  - Alicja Boniuszko, Polish choreographer and prima ballerina at the Baltic State Opera; in Miadziol, Second Polish Republic (now Myadzyel, Belarus) (d.2019)
  - Kan Mukai (professional name for Hiroki Mukae), Chinese-born Japanese filmmaker known for his popular "pink film" movies; in Dairen, Manchukuo (now Liaoning province, People's Republic of China (d.2008)
- Died: Jean de Brunhoff, 37, French writer, illustrator and creator of Babar the Elephant, died of tuberculosis.

== October 17, 1937 (Sunday) ==
- All 19 people aboard a United Air Lines plane were killed when the Douglas DC-3A crashed into the side of Hayden's Peak in the U.S. state of Wyoming in snow and ice weather. Designated United Air Lines Trip 1, the multistop flight departed from Newark, New Jersey at 8:00 a.m. local time for an eight and a half hour trip to Oakland, California and had taken off from Cheyenne, Wyoming at 6:26 p.m. local time, striking the mountain at 11,000 feet (3,400 m).
- Japanese forces occupied Baotou in China.
- Rioting broke out in Teplice, Czechoslovakia between members of the Sudeten German Party and police.
- Born: Paxton Whitehead, actor, in East Malling, Kent, England (d. 2023)
- Died: J. Bruce Ismay, 74, English businessman

== October 18, 1937 (Monday) ==
- During the recession that started in the U.S. in 1937, the Dow Jones Industrial Average measure of stock performance at the New York Stock Exchange crashed to 125.73 points, its lowest level in two years.
- The historic Reims Cathedral, heavily damaged in the World War, was consecrated again.

== October 19, 1937 (Tuesday) ==
- Italy raised taxes significantly in an effort to meet the cost of increased arms production and maintaining its colonies.
- Died: Ernest Rutherford, 66, New-Zealand born British physicist

== October 20, 1937 (Wednesday) ==
- The Japanese Tenth Army was formed.
- Born:
  - Juan Marichal, Dominican Republic born baseball player, in Monte Cristi
  - Giuseppe Pericu, Italian politician and Mayor of Genoa from 1997 to 2007;, in Genoa. (d. 2022)

== October 21, 1937 (Thursday) ==
- Andrei Tupolev, the aeronautical engineer who had developed the Tupolev TB-1 bomber in 1925, and would design or oversee the design of over 100 different military and civilian aircraft, was arrested and imprisoned in the course of Joseph Stalin's Great Purge, along with all of his colleagues at his office. He and the rest of the design group were charged with sabotage, espionage and aiding fascists. After more than a year in prison Tupolev was transferred from prison to a "sharashka", a design facility for skilled prisoners, and freed in 1941 when the Soviet Union was invaded by Germany.
- The Asturias Offensive and the War in the North ended in Spain as the Nationalists victory with the capture of Gijón, 14 months after the Spanish Republic's army had massacred 600 or more Nationalist defenders of the Simancas Barracks and left no survivors.
- Generalissimo Francisco Franco increased his powers with a decree concentrating all the authority into a new National Council, whose members Franco could appoint and dismiss as he wished. Franco assumed the right to name his own successor as well.
- The Catholic Centre Party in the Free City of Danzig was ordered to dissolve, leaving the Nazi Party as the only party allowed to exist in Danzig.
- The screwball comedy film The Awful Truth, starring Irene Dunne and Cary Grant, was released and would become one of the highest-grossing films of 1937.
- In Linate, near (Milan), the Enrico Forlanini airport was inaugurated.
- Born:
  - Thengai Srinivasan, Indian actor and comedian, in Thoothukudi district, Madras Presidency (now Tamil Nadu), British India (d. from a brain hemorrhage, 1987).
  - Richard C. Meredith, American science fiction author; in Alderson, West Virginia (d. from a brain hemorrhage, 1979)

== October 22, 1937 (Friday) ==
- The Duke of Windsor and his wife met Adolf Hitler at the Berghof. As they departed Hitler made the Nazi salute, which the Duke returned.
- Riots broke out in Khemisset, French Morocco when nationalists demanding political reforms clashed with police.
- The historical film Conquest starring Greta Garbo and Charles Boyer was released.
- Born: Luigi Viviani, Italian politician and trade unionist, Senator of the Italian Republic; in Verona

== October 23, 1937 (Saturday) ==
- Elections were held in Australia for the House of Representatives and the Australian Senate. The Australian Labor Party picked up 11 seats in the House of Representatives and 13 in the Senate, but the incumbent United Australia Party led by Prime Minister Joseph Lyons continued to stay in power with the help of its coalition partner the Country Party.
- The Hungarian National Socialist Party (Magyar Nemzeti Szocialista Párt or MZNP), forerunner of the Arrow Cross Party, was formed by a merger of the National Will Party (Nemzet Akaratának Pártja), led by Fascist politician Ferenc Szálasi and the Hungarian Race Protection Socialist Party, led by László Endre, along with seven smaller Fascist organizations. Szalasi and Endre, both officials of the Government of National Unity during the Nazi German occupation of Hungary, would be hanged in 1946 for their collaboration with the Germans.
- Seven high school students, two instructors, and the bus driver were killed in Mason City, Iowa, and 19 others were injured, when the Rock Island Rocket, a high-speed passenger train collided with a school bus that was crossing railroad tracks. The students were on a field trip when the accident happened.
- Born: Carlos Lamarca, Brazilian communist guerrilla fighter;, in Rio de Janeiro (d. 1971)

== October 24, 1937 (Sunday) ==
- The United Packinghouse Workers of America (UPWO) labor union was chartered by the Congress of Industrial Organizations, which would later become the AFL-CIO.
- The Hungarian National Socialist Party (Magyar Nemzeti Szocialista Párt or MZNP) was formed by a merger of the National Will Party (Nemzet Akaratának Pártja), led by Fascist politician Ferenc Szálasi and the Hungarian Race Protection Socialist Party, led by László Endre., along with a few smaller Fascist organizations.
- Jean Batten set a new record for flying from Australia to England when she landed at Croydon Airport 5 days, 18 hours and 15 minutes after leaving Port Darwin.
- The British freighter Haida (formerly the German cargo ship SS Vogesen and later the USS Quincy), departed from Seattle for Hong Kong, and disappeared along with its entire crew, apparently after being torpedoed by an Imperial Japanese Navy submarine.
- The French freighter Oued Mellah was bombed and sunk by a plane of undetermined nationality, east of Barcelona, but its entire crew of 34 was rescued.
- I've Got the Tune, an opera written for radio broadcast by Marc Blitzstein, made its debut on U.S. network CBS Radio with performances by Shirley Booth, Lotte Lenya and Norman Lloyd.
- At Rome, the soccer football team Ferencvárosi TC of Hungary won the 1937 Mitropa Cup, defeating the Italian team S.S. Lazio, 5 to 4. Ferencvárosi had won the first game, 4-2, in Budapest. Sixteen teams from nine nations and Roma people, had participated to the tournament.
- Born: Rosaria Piomelli, Italian architect; in Naples

== October 25, 1937 (Monday) ==
- Celâl Bayar became Prime Minister of Turkey.
- The Kansas City City Hall was dedicated.
- Died: Serge Wolkonsky, 77, Russian theatrical worker

== October 26, 1937 (Tuesday) ==
- The defense of Sihang Warehouse began in Shanghai in China.
- George VI opened the first Parliament of his reign.
- The first edition of Treccani encyclopedia was completed, after eight years of work. The 35th and last volume was presented to Mussolini by the publisher Giovanni Treccani and by the Minister of Education Giovanni Gentile.
- Died:
  - Józef Dowbor-Muśnicki, 70, Polish general
  - Marcel Vercere, 27, French rugby union player for Union Sportive Bressane (USB), died two days after a violent above the waist while playing against Oyonnax.

== October 27, 1937 (Wednesday) ==
- Near the Soviet town of Sandarmokh, Captain Mikhail Matveyev, began the execution of all but five of the 1,116 Ukrainian inmates at the Solovki prison camp, who had been transferred to the shooting grounds. Over 15 days, Matyeyev oversaw the extermination, by a single gunshot to the back of the head, of the prisoners, until the last group was killed on November 10. Captain Matyeyev then filed the completion of his task to the Soviet government with a report of the names and dates of death of the 1,111 victims.
- Japan announced the capture of Pingding in China's Shanxi Province after a three-day battle.
- Japan rejected a proposed conference in Brussels to settle the war in China.
- This is the cover date of an issue of the weekly magazine Night and Day that included a notorious review by its editor Graham Greene of the movie Wee Willie Winkie. Greene wrote of nine-year old Shirley Temple's "dubious coquetry" and "well-shaped and desirable little body". 20th Century Fox launched a lawsuit on Temple's behalf and would win £3,500.
- The Opera Nazionale Balilla and all the various fascist youth organizations were reunited in the Gioventù Italiana del Littorio. The new organization, headed by the PNF secretary Achille Starace, accentuated the indoctrination and the militarization of the Italian children and boys.
- In Italy, the colossal historical film Scipione l'africano (Scipio Africanus), by Carmine Gallone, was released. The movie, realized with wide means and strongly supported by the fascist regime, did not get the hoped public success.
- Died: Nikolai Durnovo, Soviet Belarusan linguist

== October 28, 1937 (Thursday) ==
- The Spanish Republican government relocated again, moving from Valencia to Barcelona.
- The 15th anniversary of the March on Rome was celebrated in Italy. High-ranking Nazis including Rudolf Hess and Viktor Lutze attended the ceremonies to demonstrate Germany's new friendship with Italy.
- Born: Lenny Wilkens, American basketball player and coach; in Brooklyn, New York City (d. 2025)

== October 29, 1937 (Friday) ==
- Henry Armstrong knocked out Petey Sarron in the sixth round at Madison Square Garden to win the World Featherweight Championship of boxing.
- George Eyston set a new land speed record of 309 mph at the Great Salt Lake.
- The Federated Autonomous Government of Mongolia, a precursor to Mengjiang, was formed with Hohhot as its capital.
- Benito Mussolini inaugurated Aprilia, the fourth city founded in the improved lands of the Pontine Marshes. The 31, he inaugurated the fifth one, Guidonia, seat of an airport.

== October 30, 1937 (Saturday) ==
- Mussolini recalled the Italian Ambassador to France due to strained relations between the two countries over Italy's participation in the Spanish Civil War.
- Hitler bestowed the Order of the German Eagle on Yasuhito, Prince Chichibu as a gesture of friendship between Germany and Japan.
- The British cargo ship Jean Weems was bombed and sunk by warplanes off the coast of Catalonia. A Daily Herald correspondent identified one of the pilots who sank the ship as Benito Mussolini's son Bruno.
- The adventure film West of Shanghai, starring Boris Karloff, was released.
- Born: Tony Cucchiara, Italian singer-songwriter; in Agrigento (died 2018)
- Died: Alexander Krinitsky, 43, Soviet Communist official who was First Secretary of the Communist Party of Byelorussia from 1924 to 1927, was executed eight days after he was removed from the Soviet Communist Party's Central Committee.

== October 31, 1937 (Sunday) ==
- Chinese forces abandoned the defense of Sihang Warehouse. The top floors of the warehouse burst into flames from Japanese shelling as the Chinese withdrew.
- In Rome, Governor Piero Colonna officially inaugurated the Obelisk of Axum. The monument, prey of the Ethiopian war, was laid in front of the Ministry of Colonies (now seat of the FAO) and was restituted to the African country only in 2005.
- Born: Tom Paxton, folk singer-songwriter, in Chicago
- Died:
  - Charlotte Johnson Baker, 82, American physician
  - Ralph Connor, 77, Canadian novelist
