= September 1937 =

Month of 1937

<<	September 1937					>>
Su	Mo	Tu	We	Th	Fr	Sa
			1	2	3	4
5	6	7	8	9	10	11
12	13	14	15	16	17	18
19	20	21	22	23	24	25
26	27	28	29	30

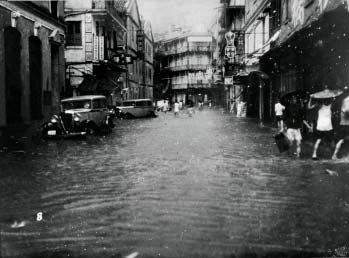
September 3, 1937: Typhoon strikes Hong Kong and kills 11,000 people.

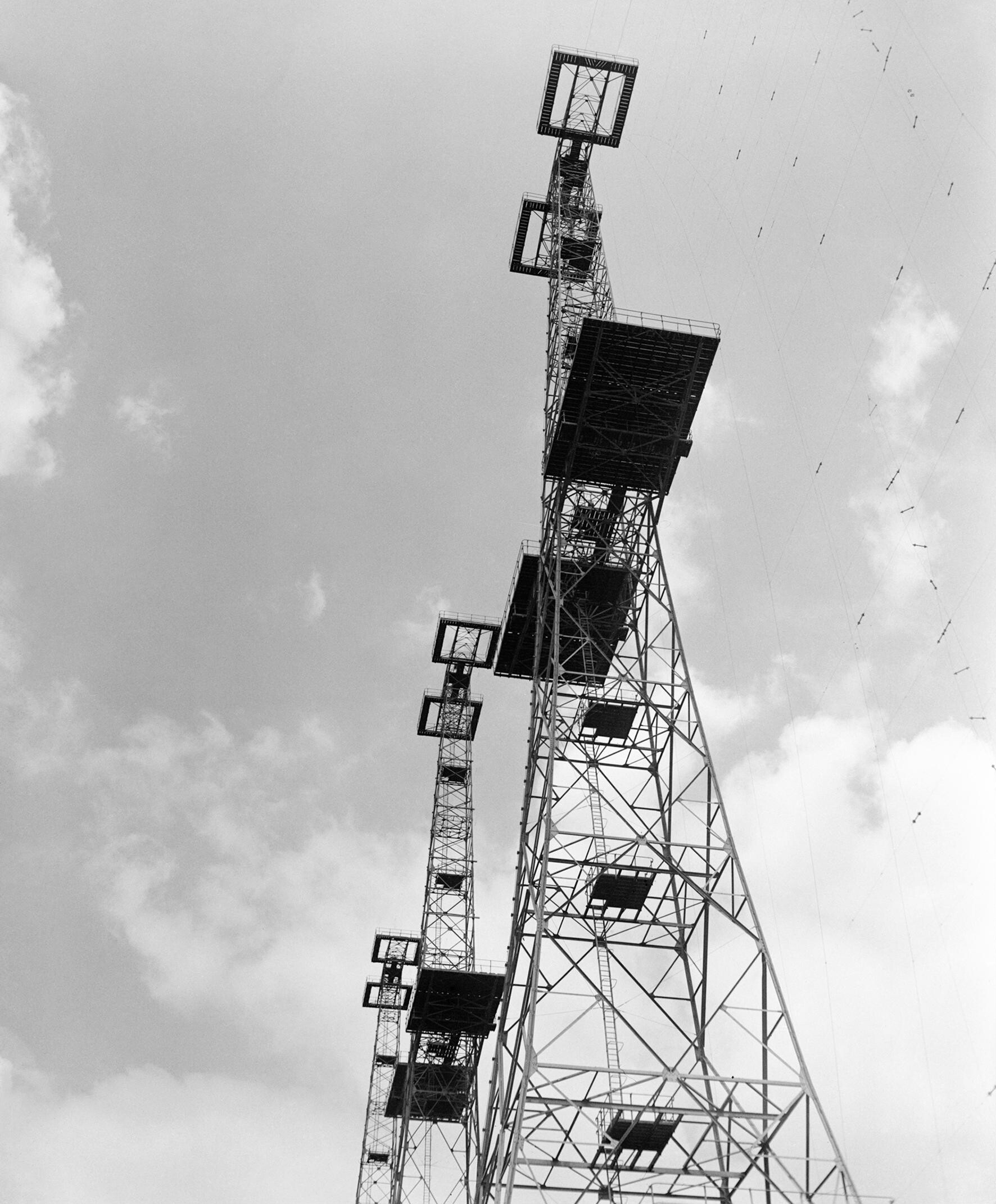
September 24, 1937: At Bawdsey in England, the world's first radar station is activated.

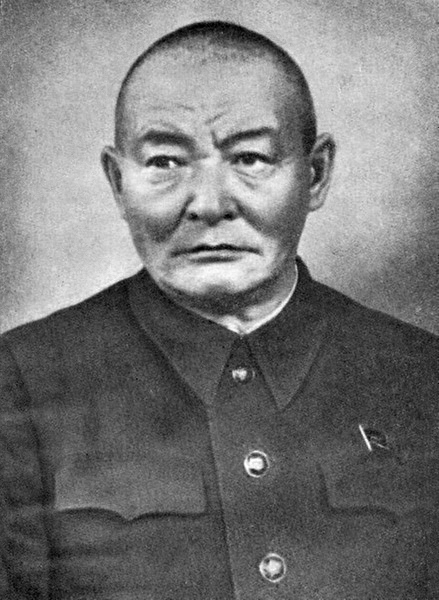
September 10, 1937: New Mongolian premier Khorloogiin Choibalsan begins "Order 366" extermination of political opponents.

The following events occurred in September 1937:

== September 1, 1937 (Wednesday) ==
- The first deportation of ethnic Koreans from the Russian Republic in the Soviet Union was made as a group of 11,807 Koreans were placed on trains and removed to the Uzbek SSR.
- The Housing Act of 1937, also called the Wagner–Steagall, Act, was signed into law by U.S. President Franklin Roosevelt. The Act create the United States Housing Authority to provide financial assistance to the individual States "for the elimination of unsafe and insanitary housing conditions, for the eradication of slums, for the provision of decent, safe, and sanitary dwellings for families of low income, and for the reduction of unemployment and the stimulation of business activity."
- Trans-Canada Air Lines, which would be renamed Air Canada in 1965, made its first passenger flights, transporting two passengers from Vancouver in Canada to Seattle in the U.S. as part of a round trip that cost $14.20 per person (equivalent to $313 almost 90 years later.
- The foundering of the U.S. freighter SS Tarpon killed 24 of the 25 people on board, after running into a storm after departing from Pensacola, Florida toward Panama City. Only one sailor, Addley Baker, survived and swam 25 miles (40 km) to shore and said that only a few of the crew had time to put on life jackets before the ship sank.
- The Battle of Taiyuan began as Japanese troops besieged the capital of China's Shanxi Province. The city would surrender two months later on November 9.
- Spain's rebel Nationalists launched the Asturias Offensive against the Spanish Republic on the northern front. The Nationalists would capture the province by October 21.
- The musical film The Firefly starring Jeanette MacDonald and Allan Jones premiered at the Astor Theatre in New York City.

== September 2, 1937 (Thursday) ==
- The popular adventure film The Prisoner of Zenda, produced by David O. Selznick starring Ronald Colman, Madeleine Carroll and Douglas Fairbanks, Jr. premiered in New York before being released nationwide the next day.
- Hermann Göring warned in a speech in Stuttgart that if a new boycott of Nazi Germany was attempted, "any damages caused will be paid by Jews in Germany."
- Born: Len Carlson, Canadian voice actor; in Edmonton, Alberta (d. 2006)
- Died:
  - Pierre de Coubertin, 74, French educator, historian and founder of the International Olympic Committee, known for organizing the first modern Olympic Games in 1896.
  - Georgy Oppokov, 49, the first People's Commissar for Justice of Soviet Russia, was executed after being accused of having been an associate of Nikolai Bukharin.
  - Virendranath Chattopadhyaya, 56, Indian leftist revolutionary, known as "Chatto", who sought to overthrow British rule in India by armed force, was executed in the Soviet Union six weeks after his arrest.
  - Alexander Shliapnikov, 52, Russian Communist dissident, was executed in the Soviet Union.

== September 3, 1937 (Friday) ==
- The Great Hong Kong typhoon made landfall at 7:00 in the morning (23:00 UTC on September 2), and killed at least 11,000 people in one of the deadliest disasters in Hong Kong's history.
- In the Mongolian People's Republic, Prime Minister Khorloogiin Choibalsan issued "Order 366" the day after the burial of the late chief of the nation's armed forces Marshal Gelegdorjiin Demid, who had died suddenly from poisoning on August 22. Under Order 366, Choibalsan declared that many of his political rivals had "fallen under the influence of Japanese spies and provocateurs," and used the accusation as a pretext for mass arrests and executions.
- Konstantin Päts, Prime Minister of Estonia since 1934, took office as Estonia's head of state with the title of "President-Regent" (Riigihoidja) in preparation of a new constitution.
- Congress of Industrial Organizations leader John L. Lewis gave a radio address broadcast across the United States in which he attacked the Roosevelt Administration for professing impartiality in the country's labor disputes instead of supporting the workers. Lewis brought up the prospect of creating a farmer-labor third party movement.
- Another Soviet merchant ship, the Blagoev, was attacked near Greece and sunk in the Mediterranean.

== September 4, 1937 (Saturday) ==
- The "Elixir Sulfanilamide Tragedy" of 1937, which would fatally poison more than 100 people in the U.S., began when the S. E. Massengill pharmaceutical company began distribution of Prontosil, a liquid medicine made of sulfanilamide, diethylene glycol and raspberry flavoring, created by Massengill chemist Harold C. Watkins. While sulfanilamide, used properly, had been demonstrated as an effective antiseptic treatment against bacterial infections, the diethylene glycol was extremely toxic. Over the next two months, 107 people in 15 states had died from kidney and liver failure from ingestion of Prontosil, also sold as Prontylin, before the medicine was taken off the market. The disaster led to the passage of the first federal regulation of pharmaceuticals, the Federal Food, Drug, and Cosmetic Act in 1938.
- The Soviet press blamed the August 30 sinking of the Timiryazev on Italy. "The government will make the Fascist bandits pay dearly", declared Pravda.
- The Japanese puppet state known as the South Chahar Autonomous Government was established in Japanese-occupied China in Zhangjiakou.
- Olga Vasilievna Evdokimova, who would later be canonized as a saint of the Russian Orthodox Church, was arrested by the NKVD along with several other church officials after preventing the seizure of her church in the village of Novorozhdestvenka. She died five months later in a Gulag
- Born:
  - Dawn Fraser, Australian swimmer and politician, in Balmain, New South Wales
  - Mikk Mikiver, Estonian actor and theater director, in Tallinn (d. 2006)
- Died:
  - Ignace Reiss (alias for Nathan Poreckij), 38, former Soviet Russian spy, was killed in Switzerland by agents of the NKVD less than two months after he had written a letter and a condemnation of Joseph Stalin to the Communist Party Central Committee. Reiss had been located by an old friend, German Socialist Gertrude Schildbach, who had been hired by the NKVD to lure him out of hiding. His body was found at Chamblandes, after he traveled to nearby Lausanne to meet with Schildbach.
  - Juan Campisteguy Oxcoby, 77, president of Uruguay from 1927 to 1931

== September 5, 1937 (Sunday) ==
- Roberto M. Ortiz of the Partido Demócrata defeated former president Marcelo Torcuato de Alvear (who had the support of outgoing President Agustín Justo) to win the Argentine presidential election. Ortiz won almost 58% of the popular vote and 248 of the 376 electoral votes, and would be inaugurated on February 20.
- Japan established a naval blockade spanning the entire Chinese coastline with the exception of ports where foreign powers had treaty rights.
- In northern Spain, Llanes in the province of Asturias, fell to the Nationalist rebels, while the outnumbered brigades of the Spanish Republic Army fell back to defend a strategic mountain pass, El Mazucu.
- In a final with few goals scored, Tipperary GAA defeated Kilkenny GAA 3–11 to 0–3 (equivalent to a 20–3 win) to win the hurling championship of Ireland. The game was held at Fitzgerald Stadium in Killarney rather than the usual site at Croke Park in Dublin because of renovations at Croke.
- Born: William Devane, American actor; in Albany, New York

== September 6, 1937 (Monday) ==
- In Spain, the Battle of El Mazucu began in Asturias the day after the fall of Llanes, as Spanish Republican Army defense force of less than 5,000 soldiers, commanded by Lieutenant Colonel Francisco Galán, tried to defend a critical mountain pass against a force of 33,000 Nationalists led by Colonel José Solchaga Zala and accompanied by a force of German soldiers, the Condor Legion. The battle would become noteworthy for the first use of "carpet bombing" in battle, as carried out experimentally by the Germans.
- The Spanish Republic finished the bombardment of the city of Belchite in Zaragoza after 2,800 residents had been killed and the town left in ruins. Belchite would be rebuilt by Republican Army prisoners of war, while the ruins of the old town remain intact after having been designated as a monument by Francisco Franco.
- The Bungakuza, the oldest of the three major Shingeki theater in Japan, was incorporated by Kunio Kishida, Mantarō Kubota and Bunroku Shishi.
- Italy denied responsibility for the sinking of the Timiryazev and Blagoev.
- Born:
  - Sergio Aragonés, Spanish-born American cartoonist known for his work in MAD magazine; in Sant Mateu, Province of Castellón
  - Jo Anne Worley, American actress and comedian known for Rowan & Martin's Laugh-In; in Lowell, Indiana
  - General Shankar Roychowdhury, Chief of Army Staff of the Indian Army from 1994 to 1997; in Calcutta, Bengal Presidency, British India
  - Kirtanananda Swami, American Hare Krishna guru, in Peekskill, New York (d. 2011)
- Died: Henry Kimball Hadley, 65, American composer known for the Broadway musical Nancy Brown and the operas Azora, the Daughter of Montezuma (1917) and A Night in Old Paris (1924)

== September 7, 1937 (Tuesday) ==
- After Adolf Hitler decreed that he would not allow German citizens to accept a Nobel Prize, the first winners of the new German National Prize (Deutscher Nationalorden für Kunst und Wissenschaft) Nobel Prize, were announced. National Prizes were awarded to architect Paul Troost, Nazi ideologist Alfred Rosenberg, explorer Wilhelm Filchner and surgeons August Bier and Ferdinand Sauerbruch.
- In Spain, the Spanish Republican army won the Battle of Belchite by destroying and then capturing the Nationalist-held village, bringing an end to the Zaragoza Offensive with a small victory but failing to capture the city of Zaragoza from the rebels. Concentration on the offensive had allowed the Nationalists to fall back, regroup, and continue their takeover of northern Spain.
- The Battle of Cape Cherchell was fought in the Mediterranean Sea near the coast of French Algeria between the Spanish Nationalists heavy cruiser, Baleares, and two of the Spanish Republican Navy's light cruisers, Libertad and Méndez Núñez. While the Baleares was damaged, it had disrupted merchant shipping to the Spanish Republic.
- A manifesto written by Hitler was read by Adolf Wagner at the 1937 Nuremberg Rally on the second day of the 9th Nazi Party Congress, offering to stand beside Italy and Japan in a "defensive fight" against communism. The name given for the seven day Congress, which ended on September 13, was the "Rally of Work" (Reichsparteitag der Arbeit) to celebrate the reduction of unemployment under Nazi rule.
- Born:
  - Cüneyt Arkın (stage name for Fahrettin Cüreklibatır), Turkish film actor known for winning best actor awards for İnsanlar Yaşadıkça (As Long as People Live) (1969), Yaralı Kurt (Wounded Wolf) (1972) and Mağlup Edilemeyenler (The Undefeated) (1976); in Odunpazarı, Eskişehir Province(d. 2022)
  - Clive Everton, English snooker player and commentator; in Worcester (d.2024)
- Died: Annie Lorrain Smith, 82, British lichenologist and mycologist

== September 8, 1937 (Wednesday) ==
- Italy announced it would not be attending the upcoming Nyon Conference on Mediterranean piracy due to the Soviet Union's demands on Italy for satisfaction. Germany would not be participating either.
- The Bloudan Conference, a gathering of 400 Arab delegates in Bloudan in Syria, north of Mandatory Palestine, voted to reject the Peel Commission report recommending partition of Palestine.
- Born:
  - Les Wexner, American businessman and billionaire who co-founded Bath & Body Works, Inc. and expanded the Victoria's Secret chain of lingerie stores; in Dayton, Ohio
  - Genaro Góngora Pimentel, Chief Justice of the Mexican Supreme Court (officially "President of the Supreme Court of Justice of the Nation") from 1999 to 2003 and associate justice from 1995 to 1999 and 2003 to 2009; in Ciudad de Chihuahua
- Died: Frank "Fatty" Alexander, 48, American silent film actor and comedian known for his roles in the films of Larry Semon, died of a heart attack.

== September 9, 1937 (Thursday) ==
- In a ceremony, Adolf Hitler laid the cornerstone for the Deutsches Stadion, designed by architect Albert Speer as a stadium in Nuremberg with a capacity of 405,000 spectators. As with many major Nazi construction projects, the station would never be completed and the excavated site for its foundation became a hazardous waste dump after World War II, with a toxic waste containment pond and a landfill (nicknamed Silbersee and Silberbuck, respectively).
- Born:
  - Beto Carrero (stage name for João Batista Sergio Murad), Brazilian entertainer who created (in 1991) the largest theme park in Latin America, Beto Carrero World, near the beach resort of Florianópolis; in São José do Rio Preto (d. 2008)
  - Mutlaq Hamid Al-Otaibi, Saudi Arabian poet; in Taif (d.1995)
  - Valery Popov, Russian bassoon player; in Moscow
- Died: Mikhail Amelin, Soviet Ukrainian Communist, was executed less than three months after he was arrested on charges of participating in a conspiracy against the Soviet government, charges of which he would be exonerated posthumously in 1956.

== September 10, 1937 (Friday) ==
- The purge of government officials in Mongolia began as 65 high-ranking government officials and intelligentsia were arrested on orders of the new leader, Khorloogiin Choibalsan. All were charged with being agents of Japan, carrying out espionage for the Japanese Empire.
- The Nyon Conference began in Nyon, Switzerland, aiming to address attacks on international shipping in the Mediterranean during the Spanish Civil War.
- Multiple victims of Joseph Stalin's Great Purge were executed on the same day, including former Russian SFSR Chairman Sergei Syrtsov, 44; former Leningrad mayor Sergei Zorin, 47; playwright and journalist Sergei Tretyakov, 45; Sergei Medvedev, 52; and General David Petrovsky, 50.
- Born: Jared Diamond, American intellectual, historian, and author known for his book Guns, Germs, and Steel and for receiving the MacArthur Grant; in Boston

== September 11, 1937 (Saturday) ==
- The French right-wing terrorist group La Cagoule set off bombs that destroyed the Paris headquarters of the Confédération générale du patronat français (CGPF) on Rue de Presbourg and of the Union des industries et métiers de la métallurgie (UIMM) on Rue Boissière, two major manufacturers associations, killing guards at both places and injuring several bystanders. The intent was to blame the bombings on the French Communist Party but the government took no official action against any of the Communist officials.
- American film producer Hal Roach, known for his successful comedy films with Laurel and Hardy and the Our Gang short films, formed a production company in Fascist Italy with Vittorio Mussolini, the son of Italy's premier Benito Mussolini. News of the creation of "R.A.M. Productions" (for "Roach and Mussolini") film studios caused enough controversy that the Loew's chain of the movie theaters suspended its contract to show MGM films and the MGM studios directed Roach to buy his way out the R.A.M. contract.
- U.S. President Roosevelt said at a press conference in New York vowing he would do everything possible "to keep us out of war."
- Bette Cooper of New Jersey won the 11th Miss America beauty pageant.
- Born:
  - Queen Paola of Belgium, Italian-born wife of King Albert II of Belgium and Queen Consort from 1993 to 2013; as Paola Ruffo di Calabria, in Forte dei Marmi, Tuscany, Kingdom of Italy
  - Robert Crippen, American astronaut on the first space shuttle mission (STS-1, in 1981) and on three other missions; in Beaumont, Texas
  - Marilyn Webb, New Zealand artist; in Grey Lynn, Auckland (d.2021)
- Died:
  - Trevor Lloyd, 73, New Zealand artist
  - Nazmi Ziya Güran, 57, Turkish impressionist painter, died of a heart attack.

== September 12, 1937 (Sunday) ==
- In Turkey, 73 participants in the Dersim rebellion were invited to negotiate directly with the Turkish government, then arrested while on their way to Erzincan. Seven convicted men were sentenced to death, and Seyid Riza was hanged on November 15, 1937, at Elazig.
- Varvara Yakovleva, the Finance Minister of the Russian Republic within the USSR since 1930, was arrested by the NKVD and charged with sabotage and membership in a "Trotskyite-fascist diversionary terrorist organization", in part because of her sexual orientation.
- Excerpts from a letter written by the imprisoned German pastor Martin Niemöller were read to his congregation. "I often think of others who must wander through the same dark valley as myself", one passage read. "But it is a comfort to us all to know that you are praying for us. I am certain the almighty God will triumph."
- Rudolf Caracciola of Germany won the Italian Grand Prix in the fifth and final race of the 1937 European Grand Prix championship. Caracciola clinched the championship after having finished in first place in four of the five events (in Belgium, Germany, Switzerland and Italy).
- Born:
  - Henri Lopes, Prime Minister of the Republic of the Congo from 1973 to 1975 and later the nation's ambassador to France from 1998 to 2016; in Leopoldville, Belgian Congo (now Kinshasa in the Democratic Republic of the Congo (d.2023)
  - Dale Hamer, American NFL official who served as head linesman in two Super Bowls and as president of the referees labor union; in Fairhope, Pennsylvania (d.2024)
  - George Chuvalo, Canadian heavyweight boxer and two-time world heavyweight challenger against Ernie Terrell in 1965 and Muhammad Ali in 1972; as Jure Cuvalo to Croatian immigrants in Toronto
  - Swami Ghanananda Saraswati, Ghanaian born Hindu swami and the first swami of African descent; as Kewsi Essel in Senya Beraku, Gold Coast colony (d.2016)
  - Perry Ray Robinson, African-American civil rights activist who disappeared in 1973 after confronting American Indian Movement activists during the Wounded Knee incident; in Bogue Chitto, Alabama (d. 1973)
- Died:
  - William Henry Heard, 87, African-American diplomat who served as the U.S. Ambassador to Liberia from 1895 to 1898.

== September 13, 1937 (Monday) ==
- The Kainsaz meteorite, weighing an estimated 440 pounds (200 kg), including a piece weighing 226 pounds (103 kg), fell near the village of Kainsaz (Каинсаз) in the Tatar Autonomous Soviet Socialist Republic within the Russian SFSR in the Soviet Union.
- The Polaroid Corporation, manufacturer of the first polarized glass, was incorporated by Edwin H. Land, initially to produce polarized sunglasses, and would later create the first "instant camera" (in 1948), capable of developing photos within the camera itself, and the Polaroid SX-70 (in 1972) with film that developed outside of the camera.
- Heinrich Himmler decreed that Jews could be released from "protective custody" in concentration camps if they provided evidence that they were emigrating.
- Jewish German art gallery owner Max Stern was ordered by the Reich Chamber of Fine Arts and the Nazi government to sell his collection of more than 200 paintings in the Galerie Stern.
- Japanese forces captured Datong in China's Shanxi province.
- The Republic of China filed a complaint against the Empire of Japan before the League of Nations and asked for action through Article 11 of the League covenant. Ultimately, the League declined to set official sanctions, limiting its action to a statement on October 4, 1937, that proclaimed its "spiritual support" to China in its defense against a Japanese invasion.
- In his final address on the closing day of the Nuremberg Rally, Hitler declared that the failure of Franco's Nationalists would "upset the balance of power in Europe, which is of vital importance to Germany."
- After Hugo Black was confirmed as a justice of the U.S. Supreme Court, the Pittsburgh Post-Gazette began publishing the first of a series of articles by investigative reporter Ray Sprigle of the wrote a series of articles, revealing that Black had been a member of the Ku Klux Klan. Sprigle would win a Pulitzer Prize for the series.
- John Pesek won the "world heavyweight championship" of the National Wrestling Association (NWA) by default, without fighting a single opponent. Pesek had been the only wrestler to post a $1,000 bond to participate in the NWA tournament to decide the vacant title.
- Born: Don Bluth, American animator and film director, former animator at Disney from 1955 to 1979, founder of Sullivan Bluth Studios, co-founder of 20th Century Fox Animation and co-creator of An American Tail, The Land Before Time and Anastasia; in El Paso, Texas.
- Died: Ellis Parker Butler, 67, American author best known for the 1906 story "Pigs Is Pigs"

== September 14, 1937 (Tuesday) ==
- The Nyon Conference ended after four days with the signing of an agreement to establish a system of patrol zones, with the British and French assuming the most responsibility It was agreed that submarines that attacked merchant vessels could be attacked in return by the patrols.
- Died:
  - Tomáš Masaryk, 87, the first President of Czechoslovakia from 1918 to 1935
  - Nikolai Ustryalov, 46, Soviet Russian activist and promoter of National Bolshevism, was sentenced to death for espionage and "anti-Soviet agitation" and executed the same day.

== September 15, 1937 (Wednesday) ==
- Alois Hitler junior, the older half-brother of German dictator Adolf Hitler, officially opened a coffee house, "Konditorei Cafe Alois“, on the square at Wittenbergplatz in Berlin, displaying his sign for the first time.
- Born:
  - Robert Lucas, Jr., U.S. economist and 1995 Nobel laureate ""for having developed and applied the hypothesis of rational expectations, and thereby having transformed macroeconomic analysis and deepened our understanding of economic policy"; in Yakima, Washington (d.2023)
  - Fernando de la Rúa, President of Argentina from 1999 to 2001; in Cordoba (d. 2019).
  - King Curtis Iaukea, U.S. professional wrestler, in Honolulu, Territory of Hawaii (d. 2010)
  - Gordon R. England, U.S. Secretary of the Navy (2001-2003 and 2003–2005) and Deputy Secretary of Defense (2000–2005); in Baltimore
- Died: George Dennett, 58, English cricket bowler

== September 16, 1937 (Thursday) ==
- The NAACP sent a telegram to President Roosevelt urging that he call upon Hugo Black to resign from the Supreme Court or "take other appropriate action in the absence of repudiation and disproof of the charges by Senator Black to relieve himself and the nation of the embarrassment of having upon the highest court a man pledged to uphold principles inimical to true Americanism."
- The NFL team formally known as the Boston Redskins (and eventually to be known as the Washington Commanders played its first game at Griffith Stadium in Washington D.C. as the Washington Redskins, with a 13 to 3 win over the New York Giants.
- The British historical film Victoria the Great starring Anna Neagle premiered in London.
- Born:
  - Ou Wei (stage name for Huang Huang-chi), Taiwanese film actor, recipient of the Golden Horse Award for Best Actor for Hometown Robbery and Execution in Autumn; in Tainan, Japanese Formosa (now Taiwan) (d.1973)
  - Yan Long'an, Chinese agronomist known for his developments of hybrid rice that has increased the annual rice yields of multiple nations; in Pingxiang, Jiangxi province
  - Pavel Bobek, Czech rock singer; in Prague, Czechoslovakia (d.2013)
  - Jesse J. McCrary, Jr., American lawyer and civil rights activist; in Blitchton, Florida (d. 2007)

== September 17, 1937 (Friday) ==
- Women were granted the right to vote in elections in the Republic of the Philippines after certification that at least 300,000 women had voted in favor of the suffrage bill at a plebiscite held on April 30.
- For the first time, a soccer football game was broadcast on television as BBC experimented by showing an intra-squad practice match between Arsenal and the Arsenal reserve players at Arsenal Stadium in Highbury, London. The programme lasted for 20 minutes from 3:00 to 3:20 p.m.
- In the Spanish Civil war, the Battle of Santander concluded after one month as Unquera, the last territory still under the control of the Spanish Republic, surrendered. With the fall of Catalonia and Asturias, northern Spain was under control of the Nationalist rebels of Francisco Franco and 60,000 soldiers of the Republican Army were prisoners of war.
- The Nyon agreement was expanded to include aircraft as legitimate targets for reprisal attacks by patrol ships.
- The third of the four planned sculptures on Mount Rushmore, the face of Abraham Lincoln, was dedicated in South Dakota Those of George Washington and Thomas Jefferson had been completed in 1934 and 1936, respectively, and work continued on the face of Theodore Roosevelt would be finished in 1939.
- Born:
  - Orlando Cepeda, Puerto Rican and American baseball player; in Ponce, Puerto Rico (d. 2024)
  - Ilarion Ionescu-Galați, Romanian violinist and conductor; in Iași
- Died: Anton Bertram, 68, British prosecutor and judge who served as the Chief Justice of Ceylon from 1918 to 1925

== September 18, 1937 (Saturday) ==
- Spanish Prime Minister Juan Negrín spoke before the Assembly at the League of Nations, calling the Spanish Civil War "a war of invasion" and denouncing Hitler and Mussolini as "international highwaymen." Negrín called on the League to recognize German and Italian aggression, give the Republic the right to freely procure war materiel and have all foreign combatants withdrawn from Spanish territory.
- The Alliance of Democrats (Stronnictwo Demokratyczne) political party was formed in Poland.
- In the U.S. in McLoud, Oklahoma, 90 delegates voted on approval of a constitution and bylaws for the Kickapoo Tribe of Oklahoma, whose jurisdiction covered Oklahoma County, Pottawatomie County, and Lincoln County. The constitution, which established a five-member governing council headed by a chairman, was approved by a margin of 64 to 26.
- Born:
  - Ivy Matsepe-Casaburri, South African politician who served as Premier of the Free State province from 1996 to 1999, Minister of Communications from 1999 to 2009 and, for four days in 2008, the designated Acting President of South Africa; in Kroonstad, Orange Free State Province, Union of South Africa (d.2009)
  - Sally Brayley (stage name for Sarah Braley Bliss), English-born Canadian and American ballet dancer; in London
- Died: Lois Sturt, Viscountess Tredegar, 37, British model for portrait painters, died of a heart attack blamed on "an extreme diet that exacerbated an undiagnosed heart condition."

== September 19, 1937 (Sunday) ==
- Seven inmates at the maximum security Folsom State Prison in the U.S. state of California attempted to escape by taking prison warden Clarence Larkin and guard Harry Martin hostage. The seven were part of a group of 40 inmates waiting to talk to the warden about their upcoming parole hearings. The attempt was foiled, but not before Warden Larkin and Officer Martin were stabbed to death in the prison yard. Two of the seven prisoners trying to escape were shot dead. The other five, including the ringleader, Ed Davis, were eventually convicted of murder and executed.
- The first confirmed case of killing of parachutists in warfare took place, as Japanese soldiers killed a Chinese pilot who had bailed out of his airplane during the Battle of Nanjing in the course of the Japanese invasion of China. Chinese pilot Lt. Liu Lanqing was shot to death after safely landing in a tree following the downing of his P-26 fighter. At the time, there was no provision in the agreed upon rules of warfare to protect unarmed soldiers from being killed.
- The last successfully made drop-kicked field goal in a National Football League game was made by Earl "Dutch" Clark of the Detroit Lions, from nine yards out, in their 16 to 7 win over the Chicago Cardinals.
- Born:
  - Geoffrey Wainwright, Welsh archaeologist who specialized in prehistoric inhabitants of Great Britain; in Angle, Pembrokeshire (d.2017)
  - Abner Haynes, American Football League running back;, in Denton, Texas (d. 2024)
  - Pekka Tarjanne, Swedish-born Finnish politician and scientist who chaired the International Telecommunication Union from 1989 to 1999; in Stockholm (d.2010)
- Died: William Loeb Jr., 70, U.S. government official who served as the secretary to the President of the United States (predecessor to the White House Chief of Staff) for President Theodore Roosevelt from 1903 to 1909

== September 20, 1937 (Monday) ==
- British Foreign Secretary Anthony Eden spoke at the League of Nations Assembly, telling Italy and Japan they were ruining themselves financially by their policies of territorial conquest, and informing Germany that the way to obtain raw materials was to buy them instead of by demanding the former German colonies lost after World War One.
- Spain failed to get the two-thirds majority it needed to get re-elected onto the League of Nations council. The Latin American countries no longer supported the Spanish Republic because they had shifted their support to Francisco Franco during the Spanish Civil War.
- Born: Birgitta Dahl, Swedish politician who served as Speaker of the Riksdag (Riksdagens talman) from 1994 to 2002; in Härryda (d.2024)
- Died:
  - Henry Denhardt, 61, American politician, former Lieutenant Governor of Kentucky from 1923 to 1927, was shot to death outside the Armstrong Hotel in Shelbyville, Kentucky by the brothers of a woman whom he had been accused of murdering. Denhardt and his lawyer were preparing to drive to New Castle, where he was scheduled for a retrial after his first trial ended in a hung jury.
  - Harry Stovey, 80, American baseball player who became (in 1890) the first major league player to hit 100 home runs in his career, and was the home run leader in the National League (1880 and 1891) and in the American Association (1883, 1885 and 1889)
  - Felix M. Warburg, 66, German-born American banker
  - Vladimir Tolmachyov, 49, the Soviet People's Commissar for the Interior from 1928 to 1931, was executed on the same day that he was convicted of participating in a counter-revolutionary terrorist organization.
  - Ivan Teodorovich, 62, Soviet official and former People's Commissar for Food, was executed after having been arrested with other Communists charged with being a member of the "Moskva Group".
  - Lev Karakhan, 48, who served as the Deputy People's Commissar for Foreign Affairs from 1918 to 1920 and 1927 to 1934, for Soviet revolutionary and diplomat, was executed the same day that he was convicted of participating in "a pro-fascist conspiracy to overthrow the Soviet government".
  - Lev Egorov, 48, Russian Orthodox clergyman, was executed after more than five years imprisonment.

== September 21, 1937 (Tuesday) ==
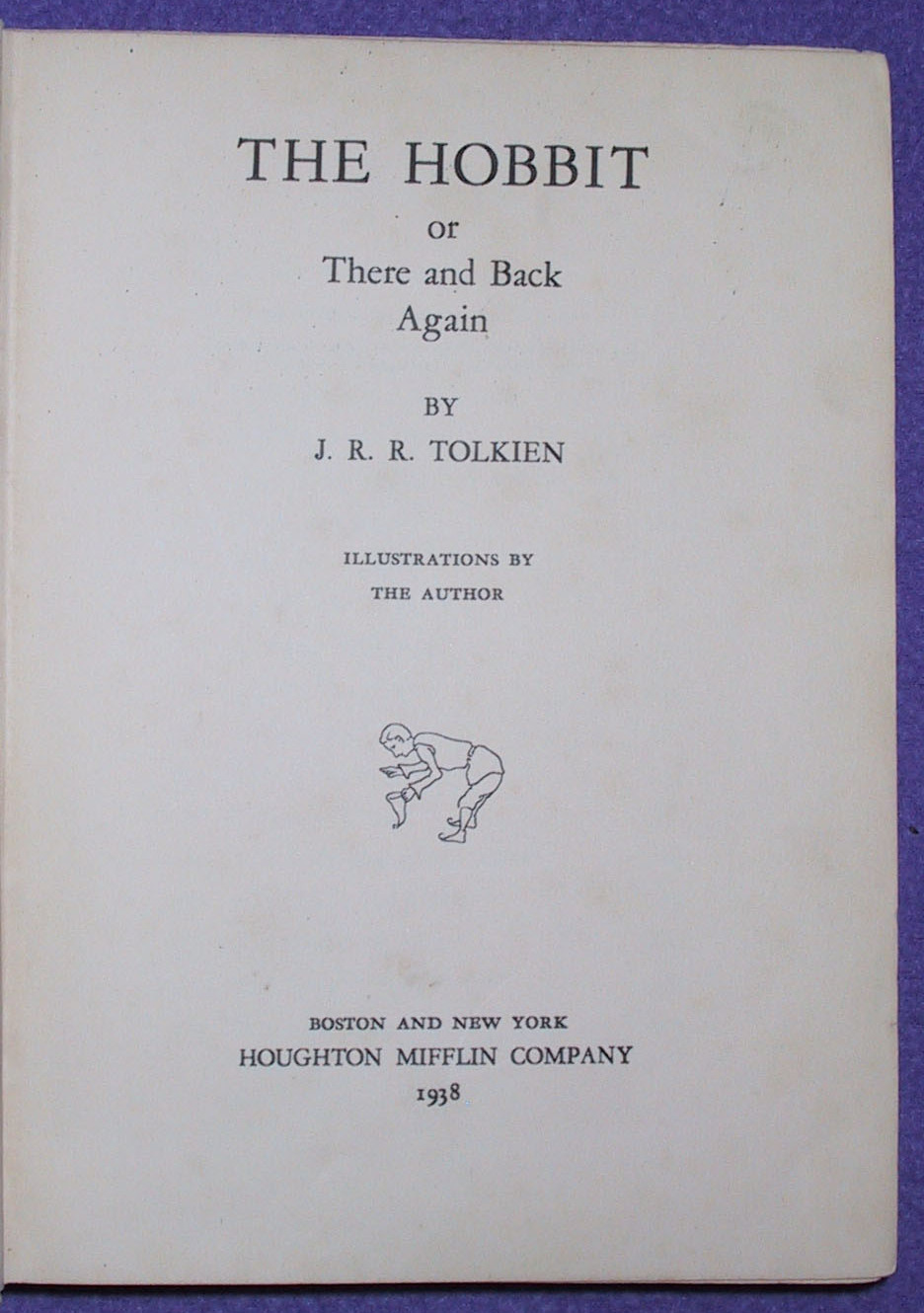
The U.S. edition of The Hobbit or There and Back Again

- The Hobbit, the popular children's fantasy novel by J. R. R. Tolkien, was published for the first time and released in the United Kingdom by the George Allen & Unwin company.
- Kunreisiki rômazi, the official transliteration of the Japanese language in the Latin alphabet, was approved by the ministers of Prime Minister Fumimaro Konoe's government on recommendation of the Education Minister Yasui Eiji.
- Pepperdine University, created in Los Angeles as a Christian research university by entrepreneur George Pepperdine, held its first classes with 167 students. Originally called "George Pepperdine College", the university would have more than 10,000 students 85 years after its opening.
- A group of 21 Japanese warplanes bombed the Chinese city of Canton for 90 minutes, killing many civilians.
- Italy reversed itself and agreed in principle to participate in the patrolling of the Mediterranean Sea.
- Died:
  - Osgood Perkins, 45, American stage actor, died of a heart attack in his bathtub after having performed the night before as "Barrie Trexel" in the play Susan and God
  - Virginia Earle, 64, American stage actress

== September 22, 1937 (Wednesday) ==
The CSR flag

- After almost six years of existence, the Chinese Soviet Republic (CSR), the enclave of the Chinese Communist Party that included parts of the Shanxi and Jiangxi provinces in the rebellion against the Republic of China, was dissolved by the vote of the Party's Council of People's Commissars, led by Zhang Wentian. The dissolution of the CSR came as part of an alliance between CCP Chairman Mao Zedong and Chinese premier, Chiang Kai-shek.

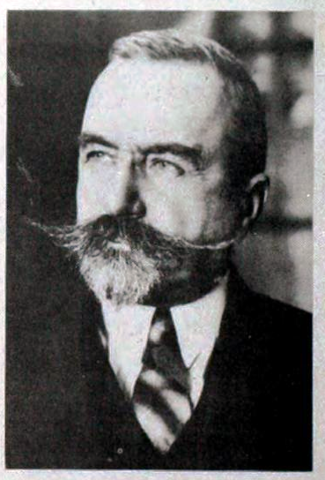
Miller

- Living in exile in Paris, former White Army General Yevgeny Miller was kidnapped by agents of the Soviet Union's NKVD. Nikolai Skoblin had tricked Miller with the pretense that the two were going to meet with agents of Nazi Germany's Abwehr. Miller was drugged and carried to Le Havre in a large steamer trunk, then placed on a ship and transported to the Soviet Union. Miller was imprisoned for 19 months before being executed on May 11, 1939.
- At the Battle of Walah near Sekota in Italian-occupied Ethiopia, the Italian Army overwhelmed the Arbegnoch resistance fighters who had continued to fight after Italy had taken over most of the African nation. Hailu Kebede, leader of the Arbegnoch guerrillas, was fatally wounded and died two days later.
- In the Spanish Civil War, the Battle of El Mazucu ended after 16 days with a victory by Francisco Franco's Nationalists and the Brigades of Navarre and included Germany's Condor Legion.
- In India, Cipla, a pharmaceutical manufacturing company with factories around the world, began production of medicines as Chemical Industrial & Pharmaceutical Laboratories at Bombay, after having been incorporated by Khwaja Abdul Hamied on August 17, 1935.
- Jack Littlepage of the U.S., who had moved to the Soviet Union and served as Deputy Commissar of the USSR's Gold Trust, entered the U.S. Embassy in Moscow and sought asylum and the opportunity to return home. Littlepage became one of the few immigrants from the U.S. allowed to leave the Soviet Union during the Great Terror.
- Japan's apology for the August 26 airplane attack on ambassador Hughe Knatchbull-Hugessen was made public by Britain and the matter was declared closed.
- Born: Teguh Karya, Indonesian film director; in Pandeglang, Banten, Dutch East Indies (d. 2001)
- Died:
  - Ruth Roland, 45, American actress and film producer, died of cancer.
  - Yefim Tsetlin, 39, Soviet Communist politician and the first General Secretary of the Komsomol youth organization, was executed five months after being arrested as part of Joseph Stalin's Great Purge.

== September 23, 1937 (Thursday) ==
- The New York Yankees won the American League pennant when the Detroit Tigers were eliminated in a 4–3 loss to the Boston Red Sox.
- In Spain, Austrian communist Kurt Landau, a supporter of Leon Trotsky, was kidnapped in Barcelona by the Soviet secret police, the NKVD. He was not seen in public again.
- As the Great Purge continued in the Soviet Union, Armenian Communist Party leader Amatuni Amatuni, oil and gold mining engineer Alexander Serebrovsky, and diplomat Konstantin Yurenev were all arrested by the NKVD. All three were executed in 1938.
- Organized by promoter Mike Jacobs, the "Carnival of Champions" card of boxing bouts as held at the Polo Grounds stadium in New York, Fred Apostoli won the world middleweight boxing championship by defeating Marcel Thil in the 10th round in a bout and Harry Jeffra beat Sixto Escobar for the world bantamweight title. World lightweight champ Lou Ambers retained his title against Pedro Montañez and Barney Ross kept the world welterweight crown in a 15-round bout with Ceferino Garcia.
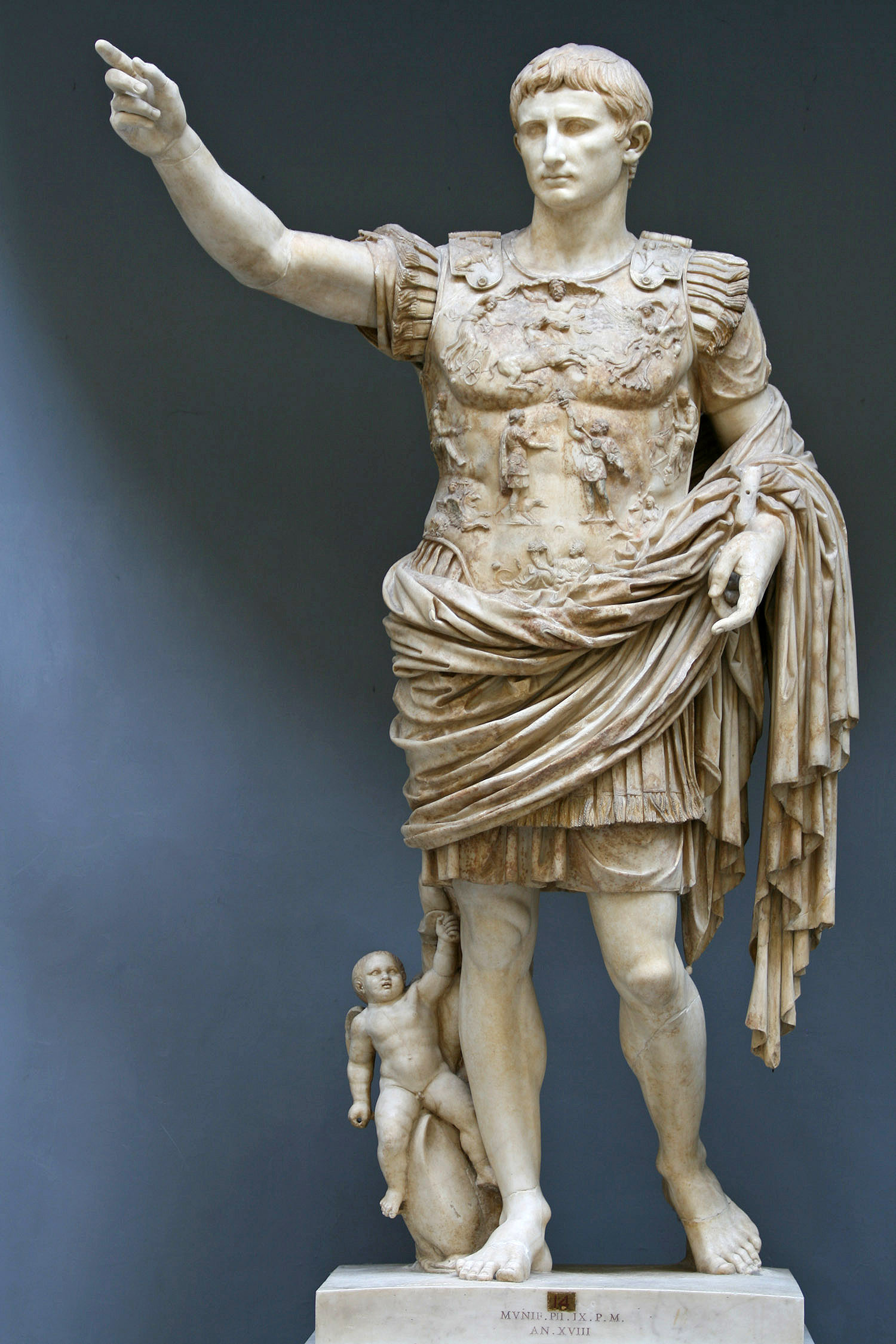
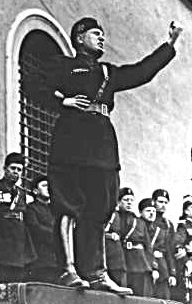
Augustus and Mussolini
- At the direction of Italian premier Benito Mussolini, the "Mostra Augustea della Romanita" was opened in Rome to celebrate the 2000th anniversary of the birth of Roman Emperor Augustus Caesar (who had been born on September 23, 63 BC) and, for propaganda purposes, to provide a symbolic link between Fascist Italy and the Roman Empire.
- Mussolini's second son, Vittorio, arrived in the United States to study filmmaking methods in Hollywood with the producer Hal Roach.
- The professional wrestling event known as the EMLL 4th Anniversary Show took place in Mexico City.
- Born: Martin Litchfield West, English scholar of classical antiquity; in London (d. 2015)
- Died: Cleto González Víquez, 78, President of Costa Rica from 1906 to 1910 and from 1928 to 1932

== September 24, 1937 (Friday) ==
- The world's first fully operational radar station, the "Chain Home" set of transmitting and receiving towers, went online near the village of Bawdsey, Suffolk in England at the Bawdsey Research Station.
- In advance of the 1937-38 NHL season, the National Hockey League banned (with exceptions) the practice of icing (the practice of shooting the puck from one's own side of the ice rink to the area behind the opponent's goal line, with the penalty being a face-off at the violator's end of the rink.
- The Imperial Japanese Army occupied Baoding.
- Born: Robert Aiello, American novelist; in Sewickley, Pennsylvania (d. 2018)

== September 25, 1937 (Saturday) ==
- The results of the 1937 Soviet census, which had been taken across the Soviet Union on January 6, were proclaimed invalid by the Council of People's Commissars (Sovanarkom) after the compilation showed the USSR's population to be 162,039,470 — a figure far lower than the 180 million people expected by Premier Joseph Stalin. A new census was ordered for 1939, and the Sovnarkom declaration, published in Pravda, claimed that the figures had been altered by "class enemies" (including priests, kulaks, and former Mensheviks) whose "counterrevolutionary saboteurs worked to deliberately hide population growth by registering the same deaths multiple times." The prediction had been based on an increase from the 147 million announced in 1926 and Stalin's statement that "three million souls" were added every year.
- The Great Victory of Pingxingguan took place in the Shanxi province of China as the Chinese Communists Eighth Route Army made a successful ambush of the Imperial Japanese Army (IJA). In the ambush, commanded by Lin Biao and Nie Rongzhen, the 685th and 686th Chinese regiments killed or wounded more than 1,000 soldiers of the IJA's 21st Brigade, destroyed over 100 Japanese vehicles, and captured artillery including a Type 92 cannon and 2,000 shells. Despite the successful attack, however, China's General Yan Xishan decided to make a complete withdrawal of his forces rather than attempt a further counter-offensive and Pingxingguan and the Yanmen Pass were abandoned to Japanese control on September 29.
- Benito Mussolini arrived in Munich on the first day of a five-day official visit to Germany to meet with Adolf Hitler. While the first summit of the two fascist leaders of Italy and Germany was filled with ceremony, Hitler was unable to secure Mussolini's support in plans to annex Austria.
- The Geelong Cats defeated Collingwood Magpies, 18.14 to 12.18 (equivalent to a 122 to 90 win) to capture the Australian football championship of the Victorian Football League. The game was played before 88,540 fans at the Melbourne Cricket Ground.
- John Henry Seadlund, who would be described by FBI director J. Edgar Hoover as "the nation’s cruelest criminal", kidnapped Charles S. Ross, a Chicago greeting card executive and demanded a ransom from Ross's family. Although the family paid the ransom of $50,000 (equivalent to $1.1 million in 2025) per Seadlund's instructions on October 8, Seadlund killed Ross anyway. Arrested and convicted of the federal crime of kidnapping, Seadlund would be put to death in the electric chair on July 14, 1938.
- Born:
  - Thomas Kessler, Swiss electronic music composer; in Zurich (d.2024)
  - Freeman Patterson, Canadian nature photographer and writer; in Long Reach, New Brunswick
- Died:
  - Charles L. Krum, 85, American inventor known for patenting the "type wheel telegraph printing machine", forerunner of the teletype
  - William Henry Crocker, 76, American financier and philanthropist who was president of the Crocker National Bank during the 1906 San Francisco earthquake and led the financing of the city's reconstruction

== September 26, 1937 (Sunday) ==
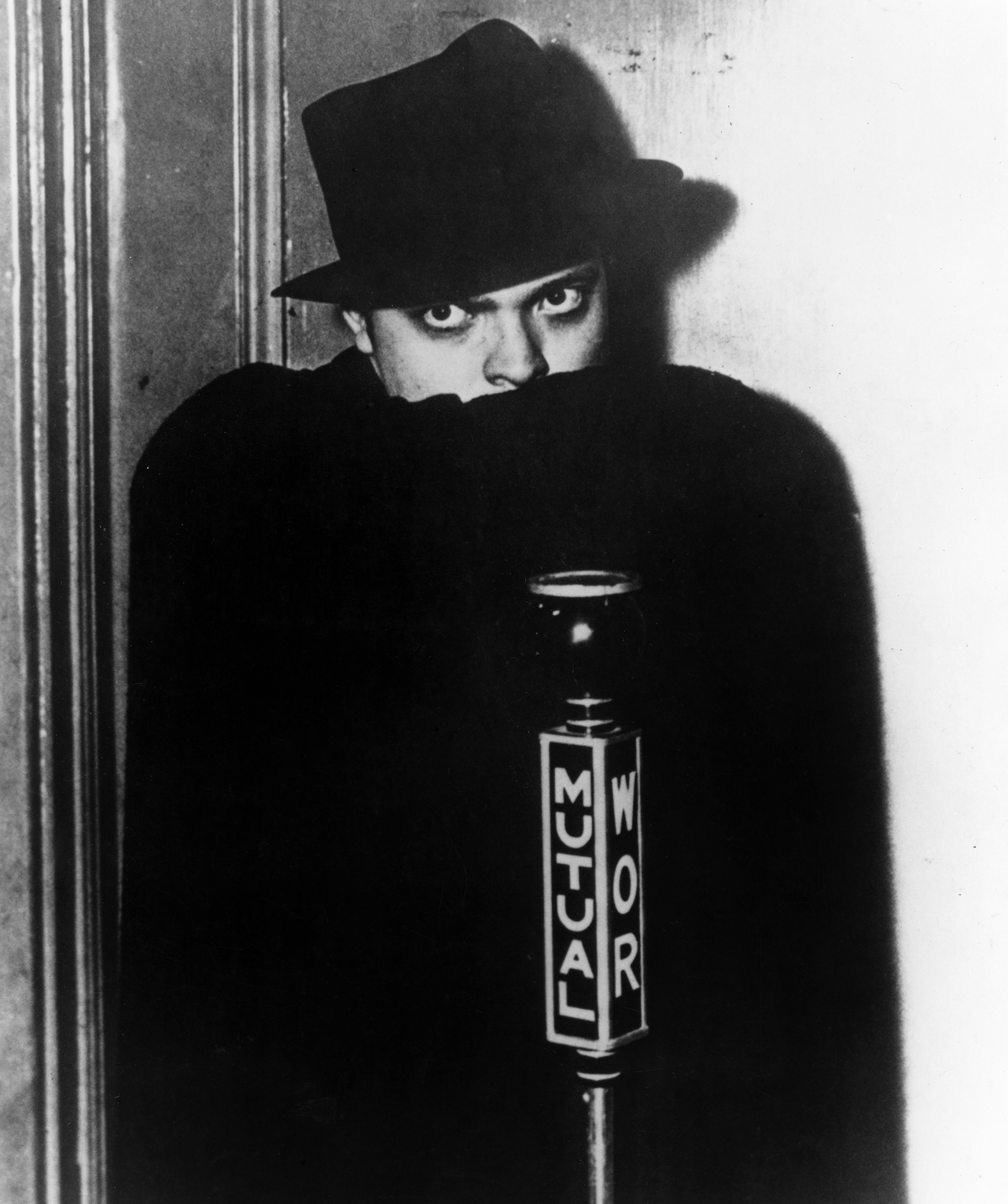
Orson Welles in publicity photo for The Shadow

- The Shadow premiered as a radio program on the Mutual Broadcasting System (MBS) network, with the question "Who knows what evil lurks in the hearts of men? The Shadow knows!" Based on the popular character in magazines and books, the show initially featured Orson Welles providing the voice of Lamont Cranston and the Shadow, and would run for 17 years on MBS until December 26, 1954.
- Lewis Yelland Andrews, a high-ranking colonial official in the British Mandate for Palestine as District Commissioner for Galilee in what is now the West Bank, was assassinated in Nazareth by three members of the Arab Higher Committee (AHC). Andrews, his bodyguard Peter McEwan, and his the assistant commissioner, Harry Pirie-Gordon, were ambushed by followers of AHC leader Izz ad-Din al-Qassam when they were shot. Andrews, who was celebrating his 41st birthday, died immediately and McEwan died later that day, while Pirie-Gordon was not hit. At least 120 people were arrested the next day.
- The Storstrøm Bridge, at 1.988 miles (3.199 km) one of the longest in Europe, was inaugurated in Denmark by King Christian X.
- The Great Lakes Exposition, a World's Fair in Cleveland, Ohio in the U.S., closed at the end of its second summer run
- Born:
  - Mehdi Karroubi, Iranian Shi'a cleric, politician and presidential candidate who finished third in the 2005 presidential election and was placed under house arrest in 2011; in Aligudarz
  - Lisandro Meza, Colombian singer and accordion player; in Los Palmitos, Departamento de Sucre (d.2023).
- Died:

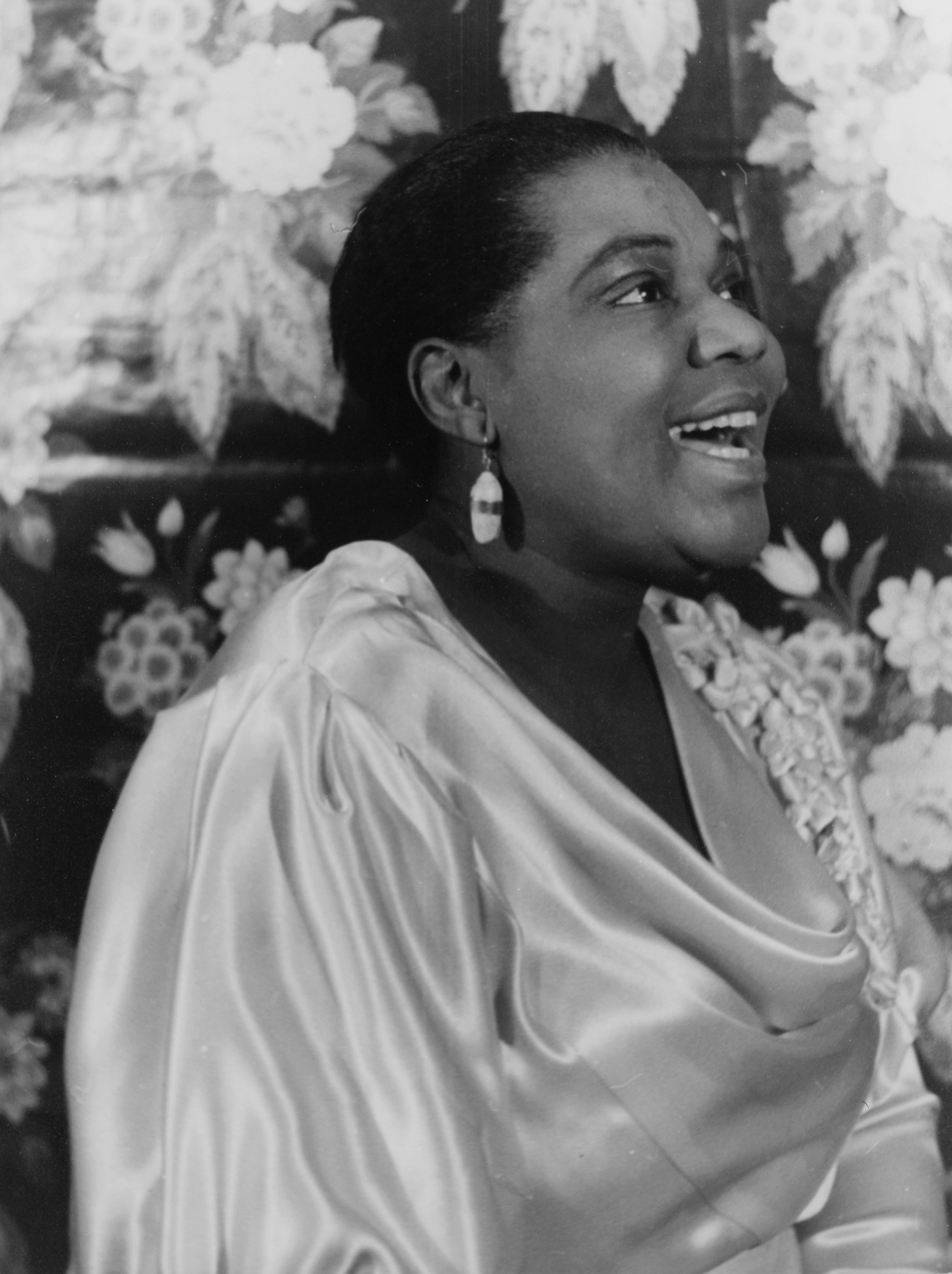
Bessie Smith

  - Bessie Smith, 45, American blues singer, was killed in a car accident near Clarksdale, Mississippi when a car in which she was a passenger collided with a truck that it was attempting to pass.
  - E. Lilian Todd, 72, American engineer who was the first woman to design airplanes
  - Admiral Eduard Pantserzhanskiy, 49, former Commander-in-Chief of the Soviet Naval Forces from 1921 to 1924, was executed at the Kommunarka shooting ground as part of Joseph Stalin's Great Purge.
  - Vera Ermolaeva, 43, Russian painter and illustrator, was executed at the Karaganda labor camp six days after being convicted of "anti-Soviet activity".

== September 27, 1937 (Monday) ==
- British authorities arrested 120 suspects in the Lewis Yelland Andrews murder.
- Italy signed on to the Nyon accords.
- Born:
  - Iqbal Hussain Qureshi, Pakistani nuclear chemist; in Ajmer, Ajmer-Merwara Province, British India (now in the state of Rajasthan in India) (d. 2012)
  - Tesfaye Gessesse, Ethiopian theatre and film director and actor; in Guro Fulu in the Somalia Governorate in Italian East Africa (d. 2020)
  - Barbara Helsingius, Finnish singer and poet, as well as a fencer in the 1960 Olympics; in Helsinki (d. 2017)
- Died:
  - Father Jean-Baptiste Senderens, 81, French priest and chemist who was the co-discoverer of the catalytic hydrogenation process
  - Tonino Benelli, 35, Italian motorcycle racer and co-founder of the Benelli Q.J. motorcycle company, was killed when his cycle collided head-on with a car.

== September 28, 1937 (Tuesday) ==
- The patent for the first flexible drinking straw was granted to American inventor Joseph B. Friedman, who received U.S. Patent #2,094,268 for his improvement to the existing straight straw.
- The American radio anthology series Grand Central Station premiered on NBC's Blue Network, beginning a run of 17 years that would last until 1954.
- German Fuhrer Adolf Hitler and Italian premier Benito Mussolini spoke at a rally in Berlin that was heard by millions around the world in a radio broadcast. Mussolini, delivering his speech in German, made the first official acknowledgement that Italy had troops in Spain when he said, "Where words are insufficient to carry on the fight we turn to weapons. We have done this in Spain, where thousands of Italian Fascist volunteers have lost their lives." Hitler spoke of the "common ideals and interests inspiring Italy and Germany."
- Matenadaran MS 7117, a manuscript that provided the oldest known source of the ancient Kurdish language, was rediscovered by Georgian historian Ilia Abuladze after almost 500 years.
- The League of Nations officially condemned the Japanese bombing of Chinese cities.
- U.S. President Franklin D. Roosevelt dedicated the Bonneville Dam in the Columbia River Gorge.
- Born: Rod Roddy, American radio and television announcer known primarily for his catchphrase "Come on down!" on The Price Is Right; in Fort Worth, Texas (d. 2003)

== September 29, 1937 (Wednesday) ==
- Chiang Kai-shek and Mao Zedong agreed to put aside their differences and join forces to fight the Japanese invasion.
- Purdy Bridge opened in Purdy, Washington.
- Born: Jean-Pierre Elkabbach, French journalist and TV executive; in Oran, French Algeria (d.2023)
- Died: Ray Ewry, 63, American track and field athlete

== September 30, 1937 (Thursday) ==
- Military officers in Brazil, led by General Pedro Aurélio de Góis Monteiro, sent copies of the "Cohen Plan" to newspapers, claiming that they had discovered proof of a plot by the Soviet-backed Communist International (Comintern) to overthrow the South American nation's government. The document was fraudulent, written by Brazilian Army captain Olímpio Mourão Filho to justify a coup d'état that would take place six weeks after its publication in newspapers. The fraud would not be revealed until eight years afterward.
- The League of Nations drafted a resolution warning that if Italy did not withdraw its troops from Spain, the League would "consider ending the policy" of nonintervention.
- The New York Giants clinched the National League pennant, finishing three games ahead of the second-place Chicago Cubs. The 1937 World Series between the Giants and the Yankees would be a rematch of the 1936 series.
- Born:
  - Yuri Maslyukov, Soviet Russian politician who directed the Soviet central economic planning committee (Gosplan) from 1988 to 1991, then served as the First Deputy Prime Minister of Russia from 1998 to 1999; in Leninabad, Tadzhik SSR, Soviet Union (d.2010)
  - Yuri Petunin, Soviet Ukrainian mathematician and functional analyst, known for postulating the Vysochanskij–Petunin inequality; in Michurinsk, Russian SFSR, Soviet Union (d.2011)
  - Valentyn Silvestrov, Soviet Ukrainian pianist and composer; in Kiev, Ukrainian SSR, Soviet Union
  - Paul Milford Muller, American aerospace engineer and one of the three founders of the British software firm Sage Group; in Los Angeles (d. 2013)
- Died: Mikheil Javakhishvili, 56, Soviet Georgian novelist and poet, was executed two months after praising the courage of fellow writer Paolo Iashvili.
