= Asigliano =

Asigliano may refer to:

- Asigliano Veneto, town and comune in the province of Vicenza, Veneto, Italy
- Asigliano Vercellese, municipality in the province of Vercelli in the Italian region Piedmont

== See also ==
- Arigliano
- Avigliano
