= Olga Vasilievna Evdokimova =

Russian Eastern Orthodox martyr and saint

- Born: 11 July 1896; Russian Empire
- Died: 10 February 1938 (aged 41)

Olga Vasilievna Evdokimova (in Russian: Ольга Васильевна Евдокимова) (11 July 1896 in Novorozhdestvenska - 10 February 1938 in the Gulag) is a Russian Eastern Orthodox martyr and saint. After defending the church in her village of Novorozhdestvenka against closure by Soviet authorities, she was arrested by the NKVD, interrogated, and then deported to the Gulag, where she died four months after her arrival. She is recognized by the Eastern Orthodox Church with the title of martyr, and her memory is celebrated on January 28.

She should not be confused with the contemporary martyr, Olga Semyonovna Kosheleva.

== Biography ==
=== Youth and marriage ===
Olga Evdokimova was born on 11 July 1896, in the village of Novorozhdestvenska, in the Moscow oblast. Her father was a forest ranger on the estate of the wealthy landowner Ilyn, and she married in 1905, at the age of 8 or 9. Her marriage took place during the Russo-Japanese War. Evdokimova obtained a diploma from the communal school, her husband became a worker in a factory, and later a guard, and she had two children.

=== USSR and death ===
In 1921, her husband died, and she became a widow. She became involved in her parish "Saint John the Baptist" in Novorozhdestvenska, which had been her parish since childhood. On 4 September 1937, Evdokimova was arrested by the NKVD along with the priests, a psalmist, and the church guard. She was transferred to Taganka prison in Moscow and interrogated the same day. During her interrogation, she reportedly stated that she had consciously chosen to oppose the atheist Soviet authorities for their decision to close her church. She was specifically accused of hiding the church keys to prevent the authorities from seizing the building.

On 17 October 1937, the NKVD sentenced her to 10 years of forced labor in a re-education camp, and she was deported there. Evdokimova died in the camp about four months later, on 10 February 1938. She was subsequently buried in an anonymous grave.

== Posterity ==
She is considered a martyr by the Eastern Orthodox Church and is commemorated on January 28. She is not to be confused with the contemporary martyr, Olga Semyonovna Kosheleva.
