= Asigliano Veneto =

- Comune
- Comune di Asigliano Veneto
- Location within Italy Location within Veneto
- Coordinates: 45°18′N 11°27′E
- Country: Italy
- Region: Veneto
- Province: Vicenza (VI)
- Frazioni: Cologna Veneta (VR), Orgiano, Poiana Mayre

Area
  - Total: 8 km^{2} (3.1 sq mi)
- Elevation: 22 m (72 ft)

Population (28 February 2007)
  - Total: 937
  - Density: 120/km^{2} (300/sq mi)
- Demonym: Asiglianesi
- Time zone: UTC+1 (CET)
  - Summer (DST): UTC+2 (CEST)
- Postal code: 36020
- Dialing code: 0444
- ISTAT code: 024010
- Patron saint: San Martino
- Saint day: First Sunday after 1 November
- Website: Official website

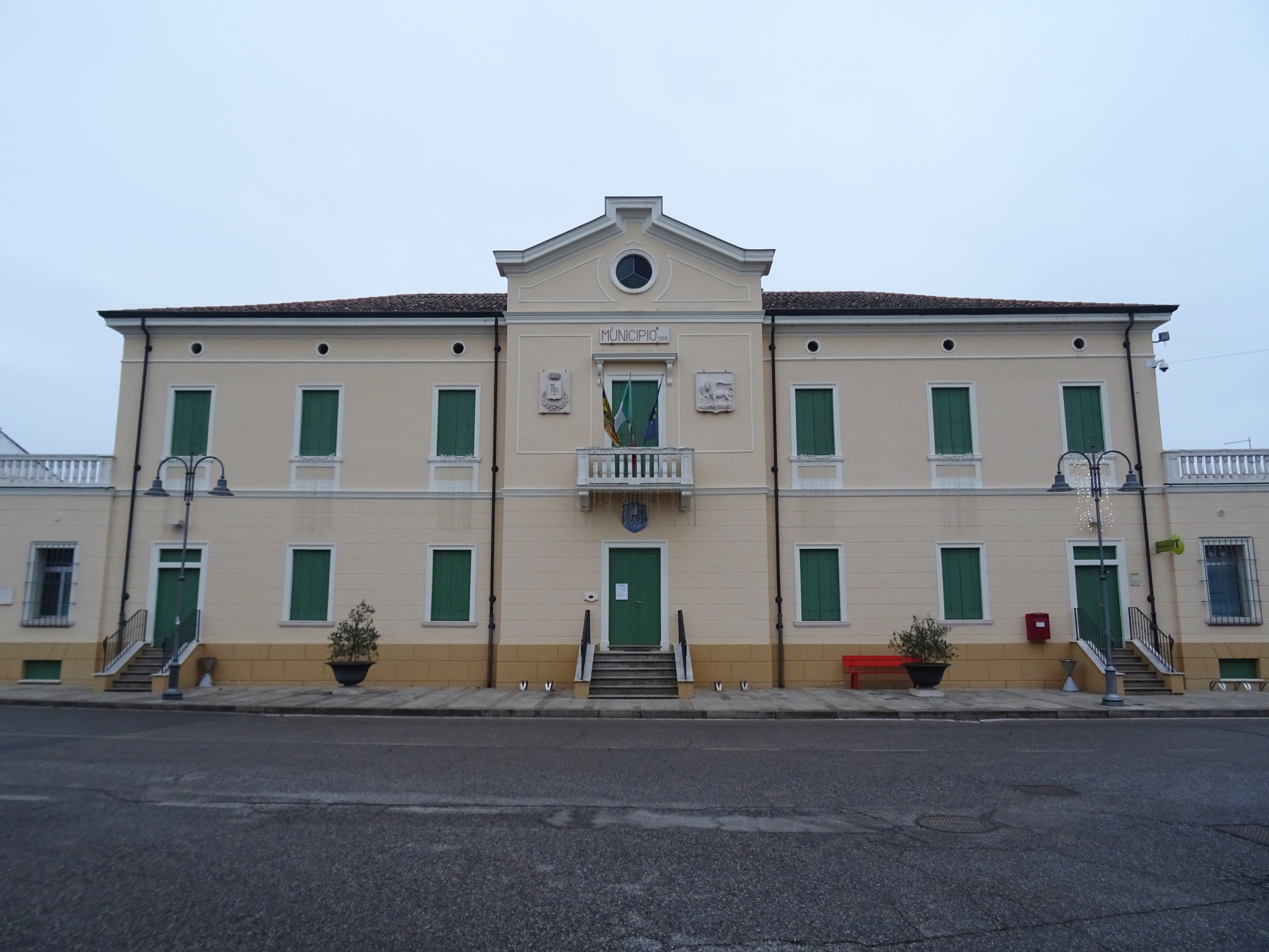
Town hall of Asigliano Veneto

Asigliano Veneto is a town and comune in the province of Vicenza, Veneto, Italy.

== Demographics ==
In 2001, Asigliano Veneto had a population of 860 and 281 families living in the town.

== Sources ==
- (Google Maps)
- Census of 2001
