= Pressana =

- Comune
- Comune di Pressana
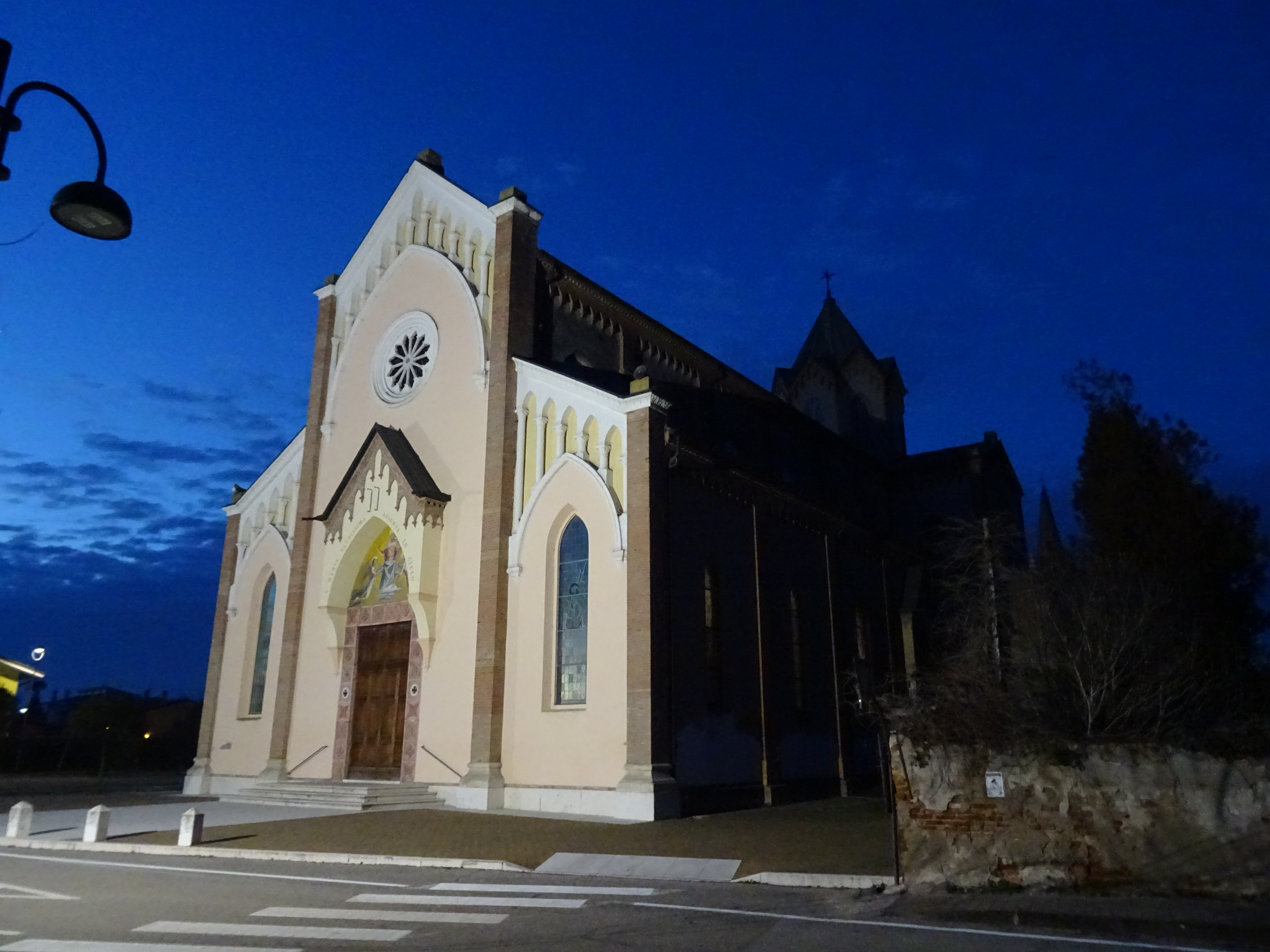
- Santa Maria Assunta church

- Coat of arms

- Location within Italy Location within Veneto
- Coordinates: 45°17′N 11°24′E
- Country: Italy
- Region: Veneto
- Province: Verona (VR)
- Frazioni: Albero Piocioso, Bertolde, Caselle, Castelletto, Colombara, Crosare, Oca, Piovega, San Francesco, San Sebastiano, Vignaletto

Government
  - Mayor: Stefano Marzotto

Area
  - Total: 17.7 km^{2} (6.8 sq mi)
- Elevation: 19 m (62 ft)

Population (1 June 2007)
  - Total: 2,457
  - Density: 139/km^{2} (360/sq mi)
- Demonym: Pressanesi
- Time zone: UTC+1 (CET)
  - Summer (DST): UTC+2 (CEST)
- Postal code: 37040
- Dialing code: 0442
- Patron saint: St. Roch
- Saint day: August 16
- Website: Official website

Pressana is a comune (municipality) in the Province of Verona in the Italian region Veneto, located about 70 kilometres (43 mi) west of Venice and about 35 kilometres (22 mi) southeast of Verona.

The municipality of Pressana contains the frazioni (subdivisions, mainly villages and hamlets) Albero Piocioso, Bertolde, Caselle, Castelletto, Colombara, Crosare, Oca, Piovega, San Francesco, San Sebastiano, and Vignaletto.

Pressana borders the following municipalities: Cologna Veneta, Minerbe, Montagnana, Roveredo di Guà, and Veronella.
