= Giovanni Rana =

Italian entrepreneur

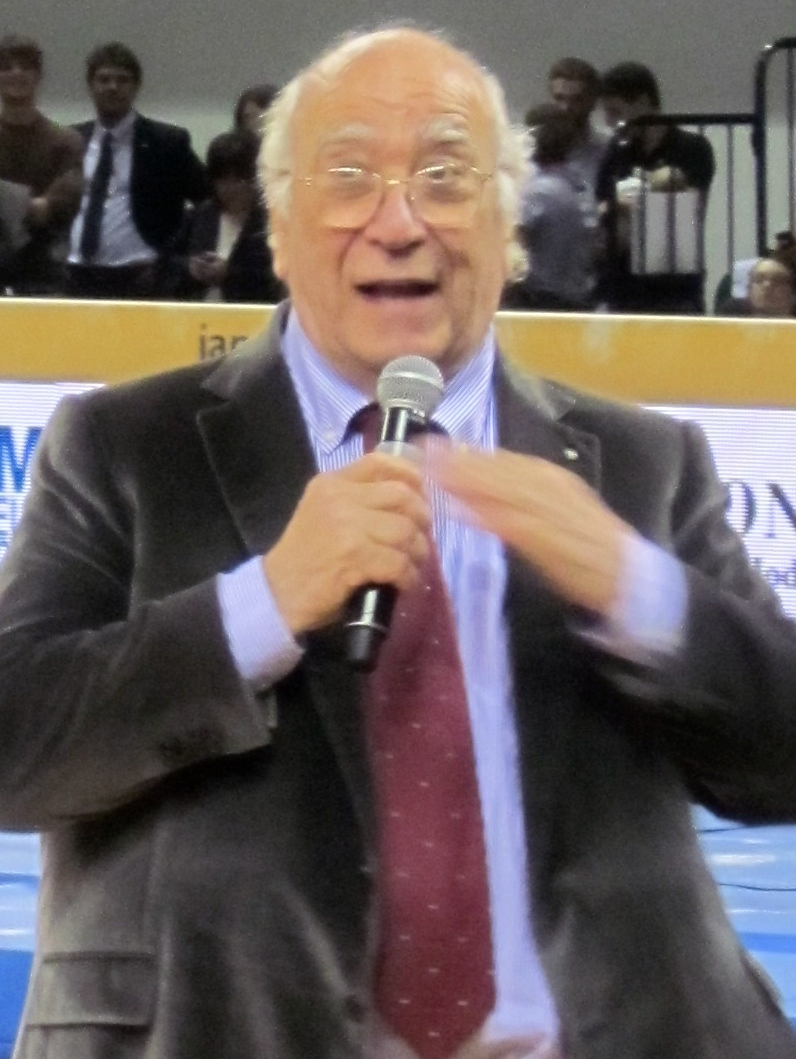
- Born: 15 October 1937 (age 88); Cologna Veneta, Veneto, Kingdom of Italy
- Occupations: Pasta maker; company founder
- Years active: 1962–present
- Known for: Pasta production
- Notable work: Founder of Giovanni Rana Italian Foods

Giovanni Rana OML Commendatore OMRI (born 15 October 1937) is an Italian pasta maker, founder of the Giovanni Rana brand of Italian food products, including refrigerated pasta, sauces, and ready-made dishes. The brand started in 1962 with homemade tortellini and has since expanded, distributing products in 38 countries.

== Life and career ==
Rana was born on 15 October 1937 in Cologna Veneta, Italy. He joined his brothers at the family bakery in San Giovanni Lupatoto, Veneto, in 1950 and began making tortellini, personally preparing the pasta and the filling. He began producing pasta and made the deliveries door-to-door with his motorbike.

In 1962 Pastificio Rana officially opened its doors. At the beginning of the production, the pasta was strictly handmade. Rana himself oversaw its distribution and delivered the tortellini from house to house.

With the assistance of local engineers and mechanics, Rana designed and developed new machines to meet the increasing demand for pasta. The machines increased production from about 15 kg (33 pounds) of tortellini an hour to about 20,000 kg (44,000 pounds) an hour. In 1971, the factory moved to its current location of San Giovanni Lupatoto. Rana's son Gian Luca (today the CEO of his father's company) joined the company and expanded the brand to other European countries and the US. The first factory in Chicago opened in 2012. In October 2012 the Giovanni Rana pasta company opened its first restaurant in the United States at the Chelsea Market complex in the Chelsea neighborhood of Manhattan, New York City. The same year the firm opened a restaurant at Regent's Place in London, England, which is its first eatery in the United Kingdom.
