= Roveredo di Guà =

- Comune
- Comune di Roveredo di Guà
- Location within Italy Location within Veneto
- Coordinates: 45°16′N 11°27′E
- Country: Italy
- Region: Veneto
- Province: Verona (VR)

Government
  - Mayor: Antonio Pastorello

Area
  - Total: 10.16 km^{2} (3.92 sq mi)
- Elevation: 16 m (52 ft)

Population (1 June 2007)
  - Total: 1,542
  - Density: 151.8/km^{2} (393.1/sq mi)
- Demonym: Roveredani
- Time zone: UTC+1 (CET)
  - Summer (DST): UTC+2 (CEST)
- Postal code: 37040
- Dialing code: 0442
- Patron saint: St. Peter
- Saint day: June 29
- Website: Official website

Roveredo di Guà is a comune (municipality) in the Province of Verona in the Italian region Veneto, located about 70 kilometres (43 mi) west of Venice and about 40 kilometres (25 mi) southeast of Verona.

Roveredo di Guà borders the following municipalities: Cologna Veneta, Montagnana, Poiana Maggiore, and Pressana.

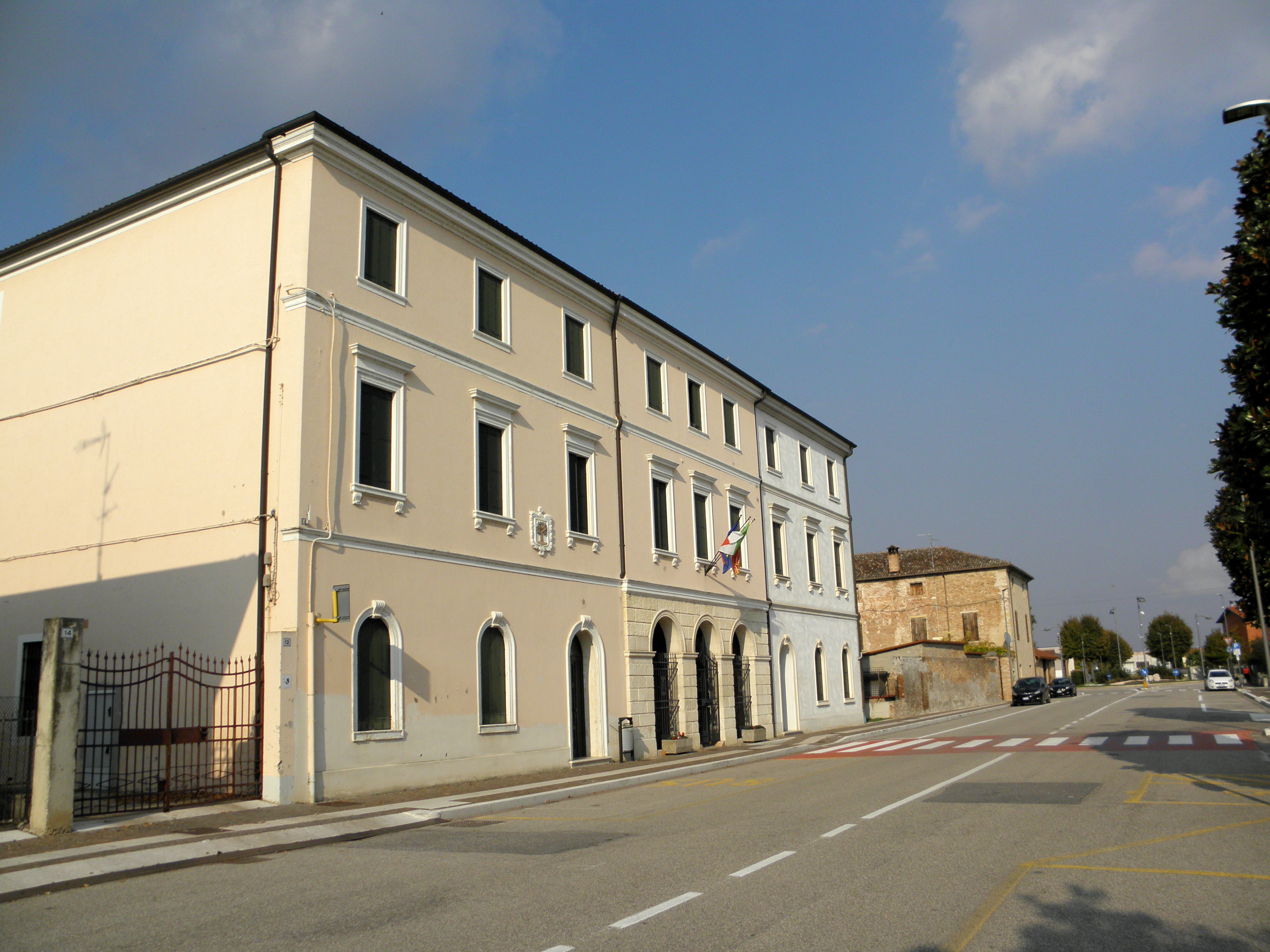
The building headquarters of the municipal administration located in via Dante Alighieri
