= Jeanne Demarsy =

French model, actress, and courtesan

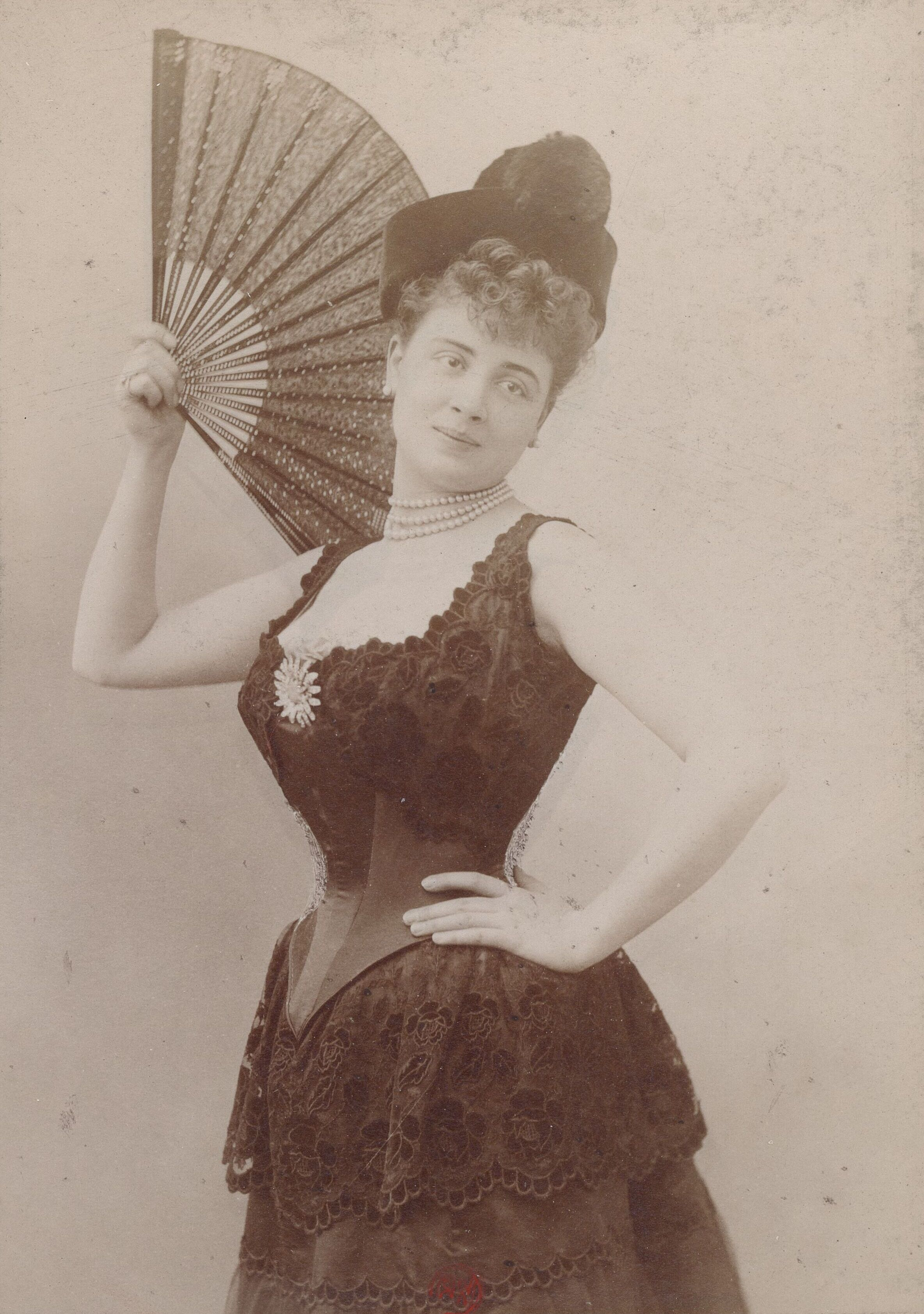
- Demarsy in a Nadar photograph (1887)
- Born: Anne Darlaud; 6 October 1865; Limoges, France
- Died: 8 October 1937; Paris, France
- Occupations: Actress, courtesan

Jeanne Demarsy (born Anne Darlaud; 1865–1937) was a French model, actress, and courtesan. She modeled for many impressionist painters at the time. Demarsy is most widely known today as the model for Édouard Manet's Jeanne (1881). As an actress Demarsy performed in Parisian theaters from 1887–1905. Demarsy was also well-known as courtesan.

== Early life ==
Jeanne Demarsy, whose real name was Anne Darlaud, was born in Limoges, France, on 6 October 1865. Her parents, Jean-Baptiste Darlaud and Adele Huard, were both artisans. Her father was a bookbinder and her mother a brocade maker. Demarsy also had a sister, Eugenie Darlaud (who, confusingly, also performed under the stage name Jeanne).

During her life Demarsy was considered to be quite beautiful and stylish. In the late 1880s, Demarsy was in a bad carriage accident which nearly "disfigured" her, but her career as an actress, courtesan, and model continued on.

== Career ==
=== As an artist's model ===
When she was only 16, Demarsy modeled for Édouard Manet's painting Jeanne in 1881, an allegory of Spring, which Manet exhibited to great acclaim at the 1882 Paris salon. Salon critics marveled at Jeanne's beauty and her epitomizing of the fashionable Parisienne archetype, and remarked how well she symbolized Spring.

Demarsy in Manet's Spring (1881)

Demarsy posed for Manet many times, posing for works like On the Beach as well as another portrait. On the Beach is a pastel in varying shades of grey that depicts a man and a woman sitting on the shore.

Demarsy was also a regular model for the Impressionist painter Pierre-Auguste Renoir. He painted her portrait, Mademoiselle Demarsy (aka Woman Leaning On Her Elbow), in 1882.

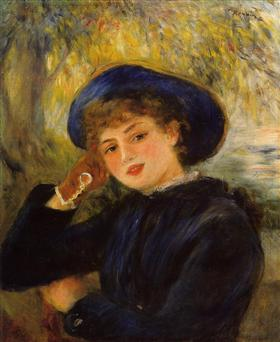
Demarsy in Renoir's Woman Leaning on Her Elbow (1882)

=== As an actress ===
Demarsy performed at multiple theaters in Paris from 1887 to 1905. Demarsy sometimes went by Jane instead of Jeanne. While her voice was described as beautiful by critics, her sister, Eugenie Darlaud, was the more successful actress becoming a sociétaire at the Comédie-Française in 1899.

Demarsy's stage debut appropriately had her playing the role of Venus.

In the 1893 play, Les Amants légitimes, Demarsy played a wife in a couple that kept their true love for each other a secret in order to get money from divorcing each other. Reviews said that that Demarsy was delightful in the role.

Important roles include:

- 1887 - Dix jours aux Pyrénées by Paul Ferrier at the Théâtre de la Gaîté
- 1890 - L’Art de tromper les femmes by Émile de Zajac at the Théâtre du Gymnase
- 1893 - Tout pour l’honneur by Hugues Le Roux at the Théâtre du Gymnase
- 1893 - Les Amants légitimes by Ambrose January at the Théâtre du Gymnase
- 1900 - Éducation de prince by Maurice Donnay at the Théâtre des Variétés
- 1905 - Les Merlereau by Georges Berr at the Théâtre des Bouffes-Parisiens

=== As a Courtesan ===
Demarsy was included in The Pretty Women of Paris, an English-language guide for travelers to Parisian courtesans in 1883 and was frequently labeled a demimondaine in the press.

She was known for being beautiful and extremely stylish. One source noted that she had a collection of 150 hats. One critic praised her as elegant and slender and compared her to the goddess Venus. Demarsy gained international attention for suing her couturier for overcharging her for lingerie in 1888. The French newspaper L'Estafette and other journals listed some of the things Demarsy commissioned including luxurious lace-trimmed nightgowns, chemises, and embroidered stockings. The bill totaled 5,977 francs, an astounding sum at the time.

Demarsy died in Paris on 8 October 1937.
