= Cologna Veneta =

- Comune
- Comune di Cologna Veneta
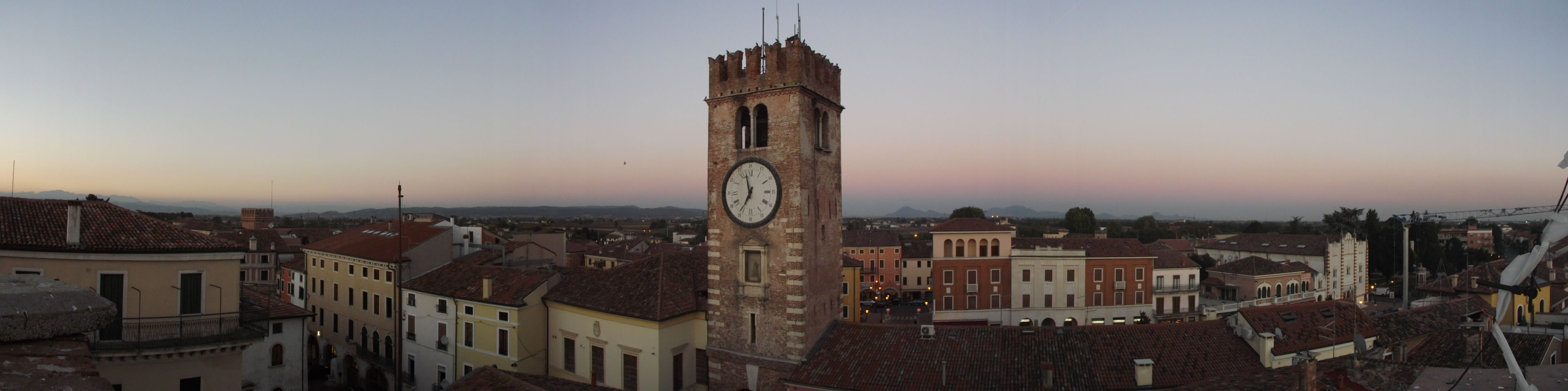

- Location within Italy Location within Veneto
- Coordinates: 45°19′N 11°23′E
- Country: Italy
- Region: Veneto
- Province: Province of Verona (VR)
- Frazioni: Baldaria, Sabbion, Sant'Andrea, Spessa, San Sebastiano

Area
  - Total: 43.0 km^{2} (16.6 sq mi)
- Elevation: 24 m (79 ft)

Population (Dec. 2004)
  - Total: 8,207
  - Density: 191/km^{2} (494/sq mi)
- Demonym: Colognesi
- Time zone: UTC+1 (CET)
  - Summer (DST): UTC+2 (CEST)
- Postal code: 37044
- Dialing code: 0442
- Website: Official website

Cologna Veneta is a comune (municipality) in the Province of Verona in the Italian region Veneto, located about 70 kilometres (43 mi) west of Venice and about 35 kilometres (22 mi) southeast of Verona. As of 31 December 2004, it had a population of 8,207 and an area of 43.0 square kilometres (16.6 mi^{2}).

The municipality of Cologna Veneta contains the frazioni (subdivisions, mainly villages and hamlets) Baldaria, Sabbion, Sant'Andrea, Spessa, and San Sebastiano.

Cologna Veneta borders the following municipalities: Asigliano Veneto, Lonigo, Orgiano, Poiana Maggiore, Pressana, Roveredo di Guà, Veronella, and Zimella.

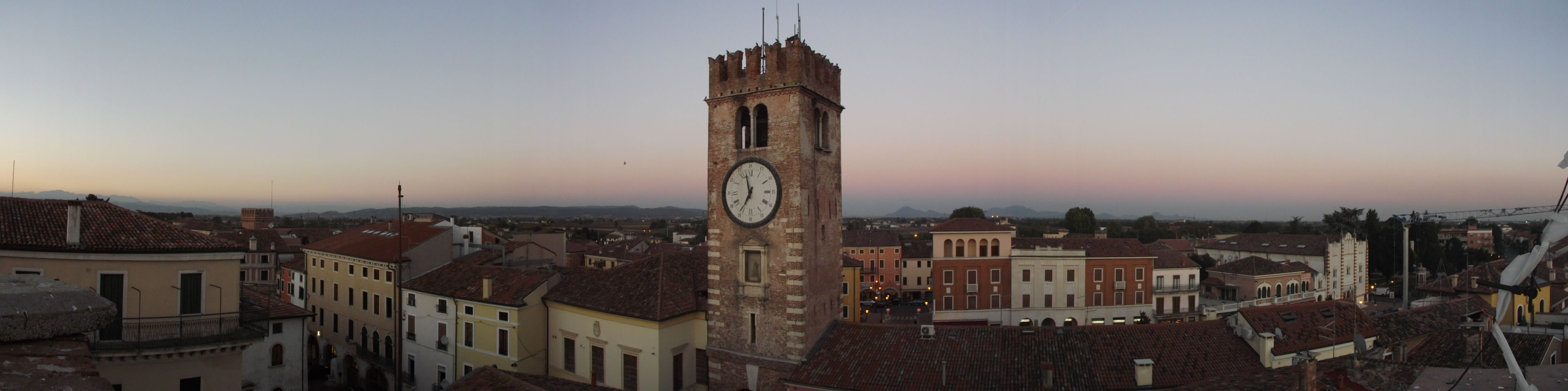
Cologna Veneta
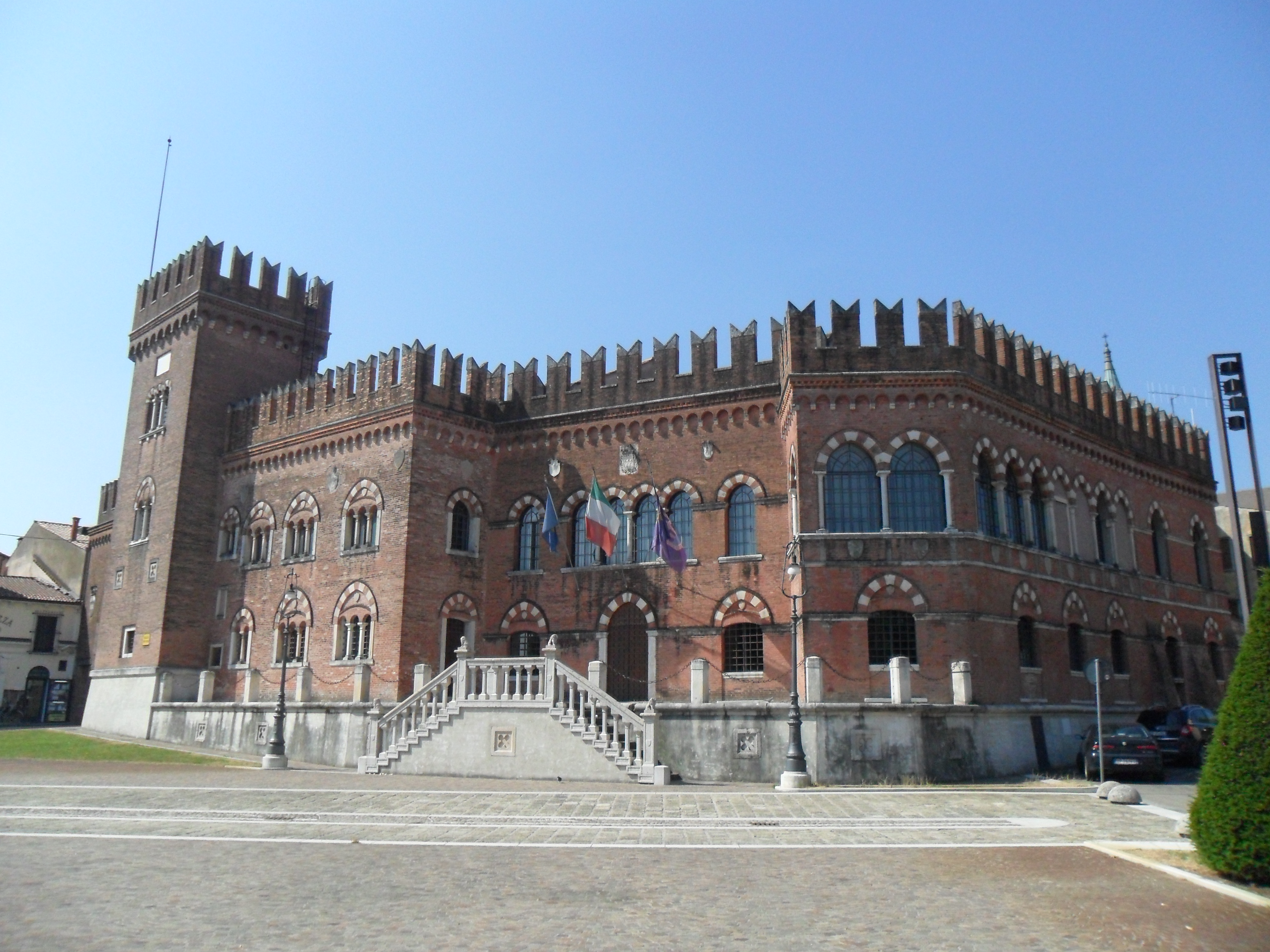
Cologna Veneta

== Demographic evolution ==
Historical population

Year	Pop.	±%
1861	?	—
1871	7,435	—
1881	7,770	+4.5%
1901	8,440	+8.6%
1911	9,608	+13.8%

Year	Pop.	±%
1921	10,369	+7.9%
1931	10,759	+3.8%
1936	10,700	−0.5%
1951	10,795	+0.9%
1961	8,994	−16.7%

Year	Pop.	±%
1971	8,481	−5.7%
1981	7,831	−7.7%
1991	7,446	−4.9%
2001	7,890	+6.0%

Source: Data from ISTAT
