= Orgiano =

- Comune
- Comune di Orgiano
- Location within Italy Location within Veneto
- Coordinates: 45°21′N 11°28′E
- Country: Italy
- Region: Veneto
- Province: Vicenza (VI)
- Frazioni: Pilastro, Spessa, Teonghio

Government
  - Mayor: Manuel Dotto

Area
  - Total: 18 km^{2} (6.9 sq mi)
- Elevation: 30 m (98 ft)

Population (31 December 2017)
  - Total: 3,042
  - Density: 170/km^{2} (440/sq mi)
- Demonym: Orgianesi
- Time zone: UTC+1 (CET)
  - Summer (DST): UTC+2 (CEST)
- Postal code: 36040
- Dialing code: 0444
- Website: Official website

Orgiano is a town in the province of Vicenza, Veneto, northern Italy. It is located east of SP500 provincial road. Sights include the Villa Fracanzan Piovene, a late Baroque-Neoclassicist patrician villa designed by Francesco Antonio Muttoni (1710).

== Geography ==
The presence of the sea in prehistoric times is evidenced by fossil remains dating from approximately 50–60 million years ago, discovered on the low hills behind Orgiano.

Monte delle Piume, the last outlying hill of the Berici Hills, offers several hiking trails through the surrounding countryside. The hill takes its name from Stipa pennata, a perennial grass that blooms in May with long, feathery white awns. The area is home to a variety of plant species, including almond trees, Judas trees, butcher's broom, cassias, European hackberry, downy oak, manna ash, and smoke tree, whose foliage turns vivid colours in autumn. One of the marked routes is the Orgiano Nature Trail No. 55. Along the edge of the plain are centuries-old mulberry trees, whose leaves were once used in sericulture.

Situated on a rocky ledge a few metres above the road at the foot of Monte delle Piume is the Grotta Azzurra ("Blue Cave"), a natural rock recess that has long served as a venue for open-air performances. Near the southern boundary of the municipal territory is the Laguna Blu ("Blue Lagoon"), a small lake used for recreational fishing.
