= John Henry Seadlund =

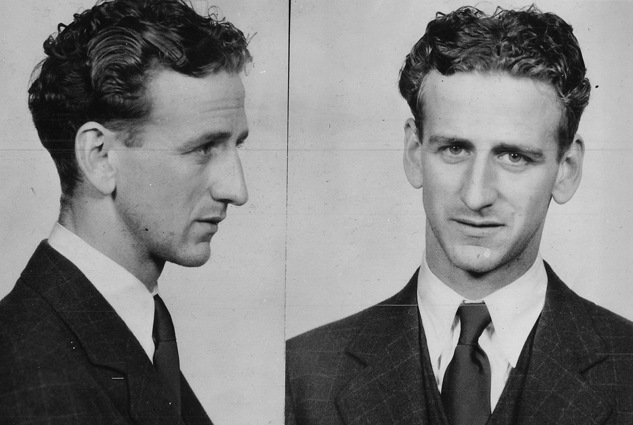
- Born: July 27, 1910; Cable, Wisconsin, U.S.
- Died: July 14, 1938 (aged 27); Cook County Jail, Illinois, U.S.
- Status: Executed by electrocution
- Conviction: Kidnapping
- Penalty: Death

Details
- Victims: 2
- Date: October 8, 1937
- Country: United States
- State: Wisconsin
- Weapon: Revolver
- Date apprehended: January 14, 1938

John Henry Seadlund (July 27, 1910 – July 14, 1938) was a 27-year-old woodsman, executed by the United States federal government in Illinois for kidnapping. FBI director J. Edgar Hoover called him "the nation’s cruelest criminal" and the "most cold-blooded, ruthless and atrocious killer" he'd ever encountered.

== Early life ==
Seadlund was born in Wisconsin, and his family moved to Ironton, Minnesota when he was a baby. As a child, he played on his school's hockey team and was an avid hunter who often hunted more animals than was legally allowed. Seadlund graduated from Crosby-Ironton High School in 1928.

Following his graduation, Seadlund worked in local iron mines, particularly blacksmith shops and machine shops under the supervision of his father, a mechanic. He seemed to be satisfied until he was laid off due to the Great Depression. In July 1929, Seadlund left home and worked various odd jobs in Chicago. Seadlund returned home on September 25, 1930, staying there until May 30, 1934. During that time, he unsuccessfully tried to get a job at the iron mines, then got a part-time job at a filing station and a delivery boy.

Seadlund's father, Peter Seadlund, died on March 23, 1933, at age of 51. His body was found in the family car, having died from carbon monoxide poisoning. It was speculated that his father's death, the Great Depression, and a chance meeting with an infamous gangster pushed Seadlund towards committing crimes. "When his father died, John tried to get work in the iron mines, but they told him there was nothing for him," his mother, Delia Seadlund, later said. "He sat around home for two years. He was desperate for money."

One day in 1933, Seadlund was hunting in the woods when he saw Tommy Carroll, a hiding gangster and a member of the Dillinger Gang. Carroll convinced Seadlund to bring him food, and the two became acquaintances. It is not known what Carroll told him, but Seadlund was apparently thrilled by the meeting, viewing him as a "big shot" gangster. Carroll would be killed a year later in Waterloo, Iowa.

== Crimes ==
On July 18, 1934, Seadlund robbed a restaurant in Minnesota, walking away with $48. He was arrested and jailed, but escaped ten days later before being brought to trial. When he was questioned by Director Hoover about the robbery, Seadlund said he'd returned to the restaurant and eaten there for the thrill of it, despite still being wanted for the robbery, which resulted in his identification.

On March 1, 1935, Seadlund stole a car in Memphis, Tennessee and drove it to Tuscaloosa, Alabama. He faced a federal charge in that case since he'd transported the vehicle across state lines.

On May 22, 1936, Seadlund committed an armed robbery at a bank in Milltown, Wisconsin, stealing $1,039. He said he came across a girl while hitchhiking, but later became disgusted with her after learning she was a prostitute. Seadlund then left her and stole her car. He committed another bank robbery on June 15, 1936, stealing $1,737. He wrecked his car during the escape and was forced to flee on foot. Seadlund hid in the woods for about a week, evading detection but becoming extremely hungry. He broke into a cabin, stole a .22 caliber rifle, and used it to shoot a rabbit. Because he did not have matches to make a fire, Seadlund said that he ate some of it raw.

After the bank robberies, Seadlund went to Spokane, Washington, bought a truck, and went into the timber business. He eventually went back to Wisconsin in August 1936. On August 25, 1936, Seadlund committed another bank robbery, stealing $2,408. He then returned to Washington and lived under the alias of Peter Anders. On January 25, 1937, he went to Minnesota and committed a bank robbery, stealing $4,700, before returning to Washington once more.

In June 1937, Seadlund once more ventured east with the intent to rob a bank in Wisconsin. Along the way, he met a hitchhiker in Montana, 19-year-old James Atwood Gray. Gray asked to ride in the back seat of the car so he could sleep. However, he found a gun between the seat and the upholstery and attempted to rob Seadlund. Before Gray could drive off, Seadlund knocked him out and then forced him to drive. After a few days, the two decided to work together.

As Seadlund and Gray planned to rob the bank in Wisconsin, they learned about a group of women who were driving a truck which supposedly had valuable jewelry. The two robbed the drugs and stole a box. They took one of the women as a hostage, releasing her after driving several miles south. When Seadlund and Gray opened the box, they were surprised to find that it only had candy.

On September 2, 1937, still in Wisconsin, Seadlund and Gray learned that a cafe owner had supposedly saved $100,000 worth of jewelry. They followed him and his wife and kidnapped the woman. She was held for two days, but released after they failed to get any ransom money.

Seadlund and Gray then planned to kidnap a prominent merchant in Decatur, Illinois, but abandoned the plan after learning he wasn't in city. Seadlund later told Hoover that he considered kidnapping famous baseball player Dizzy Dean, but abandoned this idea since it would force his club to pay the ransom.

== Kidnapping ==
On September 25, 1937, Charles Sherman Ross, a 72-year-old greeting card executive, was kidnapped by Seadlund and his accomplice, James Atwood Gray, in Franklin Park, Illinois. The next day, the two took Ross to their hideout in Emily, Minnesota, where they planned to hold him for ransom. Seadlund then went back to Chicago to negotiate for a ransom payment of $50,000, mailing several ransom letters.

On October 8, 1937, the money was paid by Ross' family to Seadlund outside of Rockford, Illinois, as he had instructed. Seadlund then returned to Minnesota. Two days later, Seadlund, Gray, and Ross moved to a second hide-out in Spooner, Wisconsin. It was at this point that Seadlund claimed he thought Gray was about to attack him and all three of them got into a fight, resulting in them falling into a pit. Seadlund said he shot Gray and Ross was knocked out. Thinking Gray would not survive his injuries, Seadlund emptied his gun into the younger man's body, killing him. Unable to revive Ross, and to ensure he was dead, Seadlund shot him in the head. He then covered the pit with dirt and brush.

On October 10, 1937, Seadlund drove north to bury the typewriter box which had contained the typewriter he used to write the ransom letters, hiding $32,645 of the $50,000 inside. He then moved westward, going to several places including Omaha, Nebraska and Spokane, Washington.

On November 2, 1937, in Spokane, Seadlund disposed of the car he'd used in the kidnapping and got a replacement. Afterwards, he travelled to various states around the country, where he would switch his ransom money with other money. Seadlund was arrested by the FBI in Los Angeles on January 14, 1938. Three days later, he was sent back to Minnesota where he pointed out where he'd stashed away his ransom money. The next day, he was transported to Wisconsin, where he showed the officials the bodies of Gray and Ross.

Because Ross had been taken over state lines, the crime became a federal case under the Federal Kidnapping Act, and because he had died, it became a capital offense. Not wanting to go through a lengthy trial, Seadlund pleaded guilty. He later said he preferred execution over a lengthy prison sentence. During the sentencing phase, Seadlund claimed that he shot Gray in self-defense, and then killed him and Ross to put them out of their misery.

"Ross grabbed his [Gray's] arm. . . . I . . . tried to get the gun," he said.

We struggled around . . . but I got my finger on the trigger and pulled it. . . . I knew Gray was hurt. He was calling to me to give him a gun so he could kill himself. Ross wasn't making a sound. . . . I went back to the car for some blankets. I put one under Gray. Then I tied two others around Ross. . . . I couldn't tell whether his skull was fractured or not. I looked at Gray. There was no sign of life and he was bleeding from the mouth. I couldn't get him to talk to me. So I took the gun and turned my head and emptied it. I went back and looked at Ross again . . . and I thought he was dead. I shot him.

Prosecutors said that Seadlund simply got greedy and had wanted to keep all of the ransom money for himself. Jurors deliberated for 90 minutes before recommending a death sentence. Seadlund was executed in the electric chair at the Cook County Jail in Chicago, Illinois. Seadlund asked Severin E. Koop, a Minnesota undertaker, to attend his execution, saying he was sorry for what he'd done. Koop took Seadlund's body back to Minnesota, burying him next to his father, Paul Seadlund, at the Woodlawn Cemetery, two miles south of Ironton.

Seadlund was the seventh federal inmate executed under the administration of President Franklin D. Roosevelt and, as of 2008, last person executed in Illinois on federal warrant.

== See also ==
- Capital punishment by the United States federal government
- List of people executed by the United States federal government
- List of people executed in the United States in 1938
