= Novorozhdestvenka =

Novorozhdestvenka Новорождественка
- Selo
- Location within Belgorod Oblast Location within Russia
- Coordinates: 50°32′N 37°48′E
- Country: Russia
- Region: Belgorod Oblast
- District: Volokonovsky District
- Time zone: UTC+3:00

Novorozhdestvenka (Russian: Новорождественка) is a rural locality (a selo) in Volokonovsky District, Belgorod Oblast, Russia. The population was 396 as of 2010. There are 3 streets.

== Geography ==
Novorozhdestvenka is located 10 km north of Volokonovka (the district's administrative centre) by road. Staroivanovka is the nearest rural locality.
