= Alleanza Securitas Esperia =

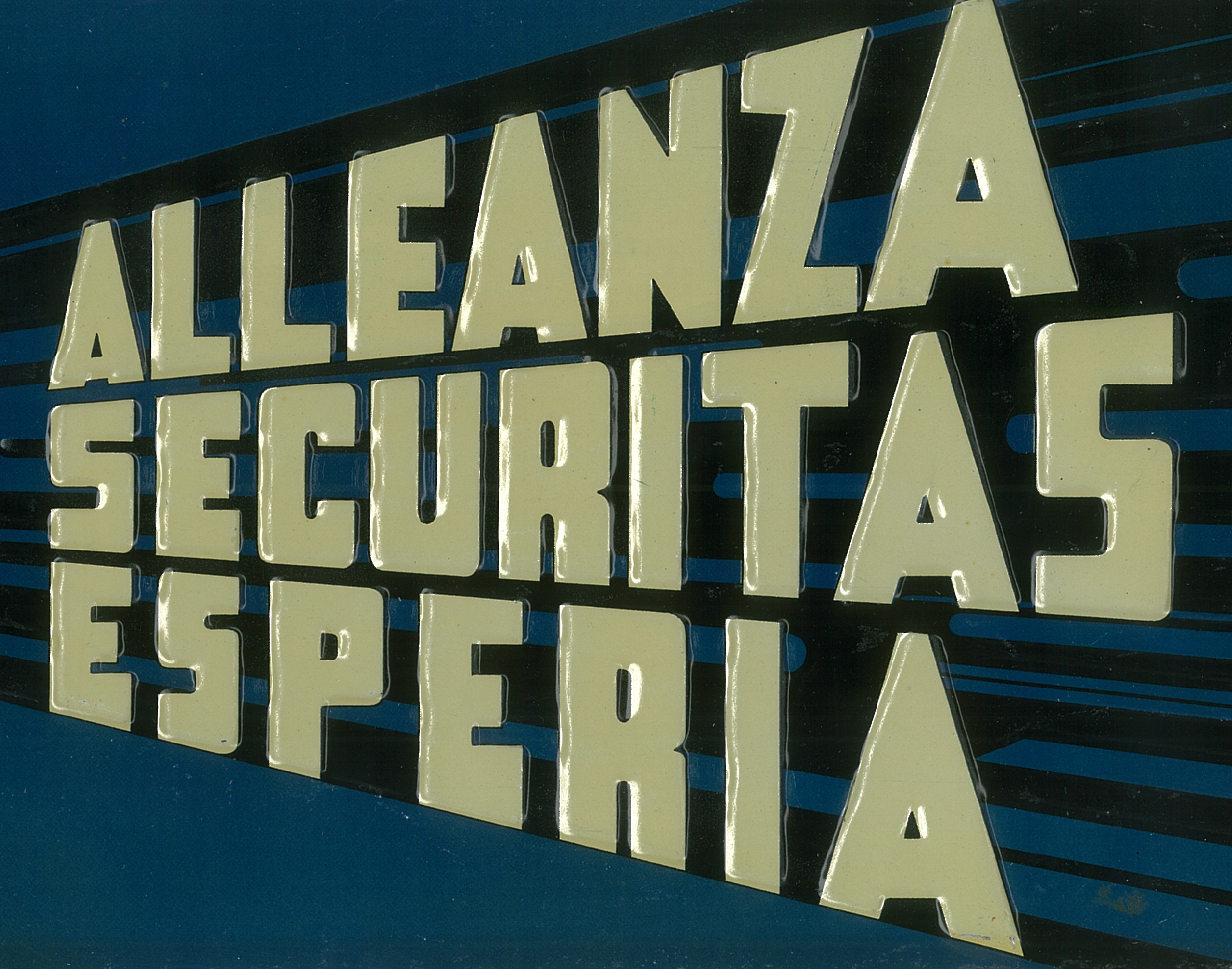
- Industry: Insurance
- Founded: 1933
- Defunct: 1998

Alleanza Securitas Esperia, also known as Allsecures, was an Italian insurance company. It was formed in Rome in 1933 by a merger of Alleanza & Unione Mediterranea with Securitas Esperia, a part of the Assicurazioni Generali group. In 1965 it was the thirtieth Italian insurance company by total insurance premiums. It was merged into the Axa group in 1998.

== Formation ==
A corporate history of Assicurazioni Generali describes Alleanza Securitas Esperia as the result of Generali's acquisition of Alleanza & Unione Mediterranea and its merger with Securitas Esperia, an insurer already controlled by Generali. The new company, also called Allsecures, was no longer part of the Generali group, while life-insurance activities connected with the group helped form the basis of Alleanza Assicurazioni. The legal concentration was approved by a ministerial decree of 1 November 1933, published in the Gazzetta Ufficiale del Regno d'Italia. The decree approved a 10 October 1933 agreement by which Securitas Esperia transferred its entire insurance portfolio to Alleanza Securitas Esperia, formerly Alleanza e Unione Mediterranea, and authorised the Rome-based company to continue the combined insurance business.
