= Elio Mosele =

Italian politician (1934–2024)

President of the Province of Verona
- In office 27 June 2004 – 7 June 2009
- Preceded by: Aleardo Merlin
- Succeeded by: Giovanni Miozzi

Personal details
- Born: 12 May 1934 San Bonifacio, Kingdom of Italy
- Died: 8 October 2024 (aged 90)
- Party: Independent
- Occupation: Schoolteacher

Elio Mosele (12 May 1934 – 8 October 2024) was an Italian schoolteacher and politician. An independent, he served as president of the Province of Verona from 2004 to 2009.

Mosele held a degree in Foreign Languages from the University of Verona, where he was rector between 1999–2004, head of the Foreign Languages faculty between 1992–1998, and a professor of French Language and Literature since 1990. He died on 8 October 2024, at the age of 90.
