= Philippe Donnet =

French business executive

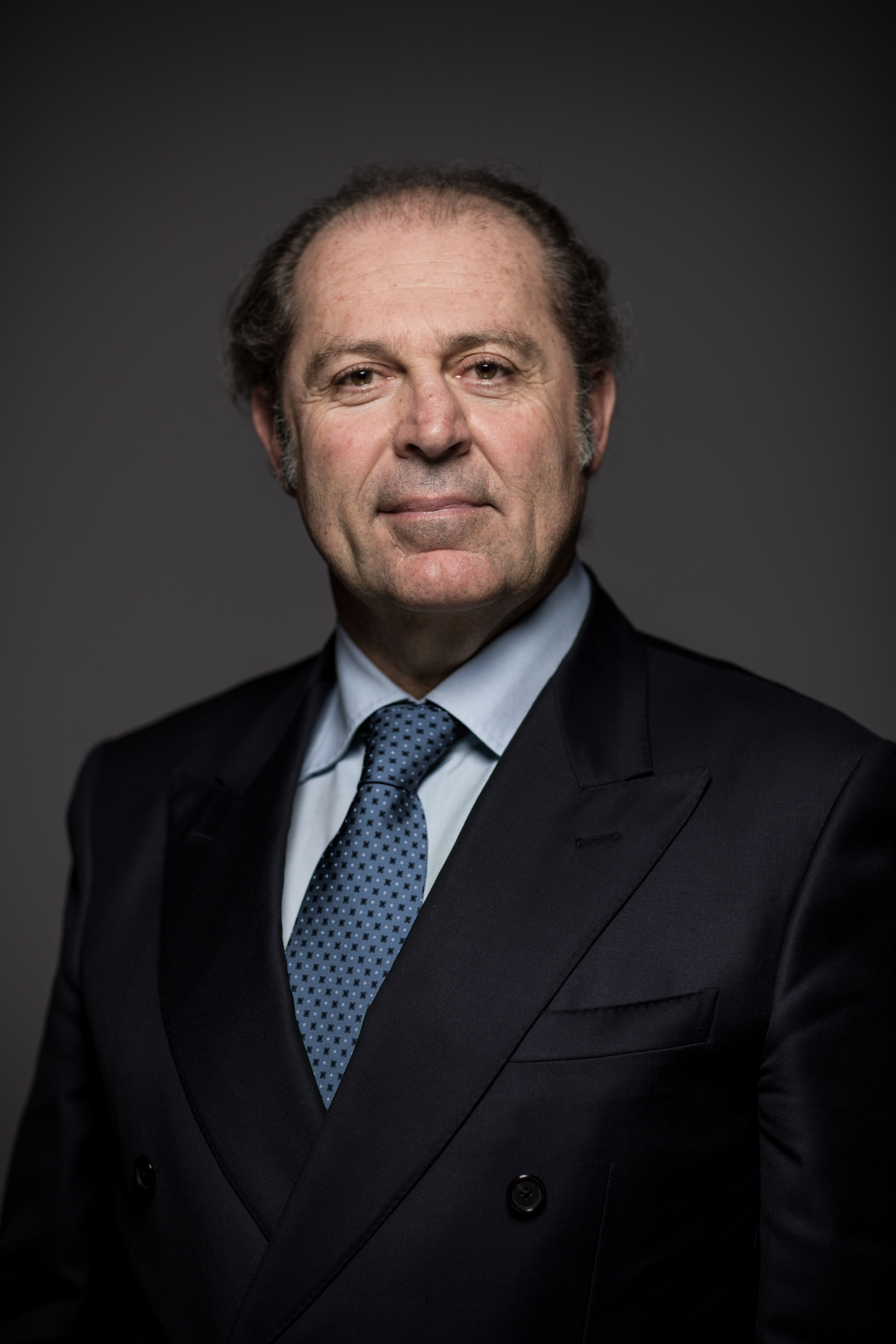
- Born: July 26, 1960 (age 66); Suresnes, France
- Education: École Polytechnique, Institut des Actuaires
- Employer: Assicurazioni Generali
- Title: CEO
- Term: 2016–present

Philippe Donnet (born 26 July 1960 in Suresnes, France) is a French business executive with Italian citizenship and has been the CEO of Assicurazioni Generali since March 2016.

== Education ==
Donnet entered École Polytechnique in 1980 and graduated in Engineering in 1983; there he met Claude Bébéar, the founder of AXA, who later became his mentor. In 1986, he became an actuary, and in 1991 he became agrégé at the Institute of Actuaries of France.

== Career ==
=== Early career ===
In 1985, Donnet began his insurance career at AXA, where he held different positions until 1997, when he was appointed Deputy Managing Director of AXA Conseil.

In 1999, Donnet was appointed CEO of AXA Assicurazioni in Italy and then in 2001 he was appointed Regional CEO, responsible for the Mediterranean region, Middle East, Latin America and Canada. Additionally, in 2002, Donnet was assigned the role of chairman and CEO of AXA Re as well as Chairman of AXA Corporate Solutions. In 2003, Donnet was named CEO of Axa Japan where he operated in the context of an economy characterized by very low interest rates; in 2006 he took on the role of CEO for the entire Asia-Pacific region.

In 2007, he left the insurance sector for a period of six years to take on the position of General Manager for the Asia-Pacific region at Wendel Investissement, Singapore. In 2010, Donnet founded HLD, an investment firm. In 2008, he joined the Board of Directors of Vivendi, a role he kept until 2016.

=== Career at Generali ===
Donnet joined Generali in 2013 as country manager for Italy and CEO of Generali Italia. He led the integration of five Generali Group brands (Generali, Ina Assitalia, Toro, Lloyd Italico e Augusta). In the same period, starting from February 2015, he held the position of Chairman of the MIB School of Management in Trieste for three years.

Appointed CEO of Generali Group on 17 March 2016, under his management the Group's results improved significantly between 2016 and 2021: the operating result grew from 4.8 billion to reach 5.9 billion euros (the best operating result ever), the net result reached 2.8 billion from 2.0 billion euros, debt dropped to 9.6 billion from 13.1 billion euro, and the Solvency Ratio rose to 227%, up from 175%. Under his guidance, Generali renewed its relationship with Venice, collaborating in the restoration of the Royal Gardens (2019), restoring the Procuratie Vecchie (reopened to the public in 2022), and participating in the foundation of the association "Venice, the world capital of sustainability.”

In May 2016, he was appointed Chairman of Generali Italia, a role he held until August 2022.

In 2022, Generali’s outgoing board put forward Donnet for a third mandate as CEO. On 29 April 2022, Donnet was reconfirmed as Group CEO of Generali, with the majority of votes of the Shareholders' Meeting in favour of his reappointment.

== Other activities ==
- Italian National Association of Insurance Companies (ANIA), Vice President (2016-2017)
- He supported the creation of The Human Safety Net, Generali's initiative to help vulnerable families and the integration of refugees through work and entrepreneurship, of which he is a Board member (since 2017)
- Insurance Development Forum (IDF), Member of the Steering Committee (since 2022)
- Domaine national de Chambord, President of the Board of Directors (since July 2023)
- Pan-European Insurance Forum (PEIF), Chair (since October 2024)

== Personal life ==
Donnet is a former rugby player and he is among the major French wood barrel manufacturers.

He is very attached to the city of Venice, where he chose to reside; on 23 April 2021, he was conferred Italian citizenship by the mayor Luigi Brugnaro.

He is passionate about cycling and tennis and has three children.

== Honours and awards ==
- France: Chevalier (Knight) of the Ordre national du Mérite in 2006
- France: Chevalier (Knight) of the Légion d'honneur in 2016
- Italy: Cavaliere (Knight) of the Order of Merit for Labour in 2021

=== Other awards ===
- In 2022, 2023, and 2024 he was named "Best CEO" of the insurance sector in the All-Europe Executive Team ranking of Institutional Investors
- In 2023
  - the Foreign Policy Association awarded him the "Corporate Social Responsibility Award"
  - the Fondazione Premio Galileo 2000 awarded him the "Premio Galileo 2000 per l'Impresa"

== See also ==
- Assicurazioni Generali
- Andrea Sironi
