= Timeline of Verona =

The following is a timeline of the history of the city of Verona in the Veneto region of Italy.

== Prior to 18th century ==
- 2nd century BCE – Ponte Pietra (Verona) (bridge) and Via Postumia (road) built.
- 49 BCE – Verona becomes a Roman municipium.
- 1st century CE – Verona Arena and Via Claudia Augusta (road) built.
- 4th-5th century – Roman Catholic Diocese of Verona active (approximate date).
- 312 – Battle of Verona (312); Constantinian forces win.
- 362 – Zeno of Verona becomes bishop (approximate date).
- 489 – Battle of Verona (489); Ostrogoths win.
- 556 – Forces of Narses of the Byzantine Empire take Verona (approximate date).
- 568 – Lombards in power.
- 572 – Lombard king Alboin assassinated on the Colle San Pietro.
- 589 – October: Alleged flood.
- 774 – Verona taken by forces of Charlemagne.
- 1065 – San Fermo Maggiore church construction begins (approximate date).
- 1117 – 1117 Verona earthquake.
- 1185 – Papal election, 1185 held at Verona.
- 1187 – Verona Cathedral consecrated by Pope Urban III.
- 1260 – Mastino I della Scala becomes capitano del popolo of Verona; Scaligeri rule begins.
- 1290 – Sant'Anastasia church construction begins.
- 1354 – Castelvecchio Bridge built.
- 1363 – Palazzo di Cansignorio built on the Piazza dei Signori (approximate date).
- 1370 – Scaligeri Palace remodelled (approximate date).
- 1375 – Castelvecchio (castle) built.
- 1380 – Public clock installed (approximate date).
- 1387 – Scaligeri rule ends.
- 1393 – Castel San Pietro (Verona) rebuilt.
- 1398 – Basilica of San Zeno rebuilt.
- 1405 – Venetian forces take Verona; city pledges devotion to Venice.
- 1470 – Printing press in operation.
- 1471 – Sant'Anastasia church consecrated.
- 1493 – Loggia del Consiglio built on the Piazza dei Signori.
- 1540 – Porta Nuova, Verona (gate) built on the Corso Porta Nuova.
- 1543 – Accademia Filarmonica di Verona (music academy) founded.
- 1555 – Accademia Olimpica founded.
- 1560 – Palazzo Canossa built.
- 1585 – Teatro Olimpico (theatre) opens.
- 1610 – Palazzo della Gran Guardia construction begins.
- 1630 – Plague.

== 18th–19th centuries ==
- 1732 – Teatro Filarmonico (theatre) opens.
- 1738 – Museo lapidario maffeiano (museum) established.
- 1757 – Flood.
- 1782 – Societa Italiana delle Scienze formed.
- 1792 – Biblioteca civica di Verona (library) founded.
- 1796 – Verona occupied by French forces during the French Revolutionary Wars.
- 1797 – April: Uprising against French occupiers.
- 1801
  - City divided into French area (Veronetta) and Austrian area, per Treaty of Lunéville.
  - Castel San Pietro dismantled.
- 1805 – French in power.
- 1814 – February: Verona taken by Austrian forces.
- 1815 – Verona becomes part of the Kingdom of Lombardy–Venetia of the Austrian Empire per Congress of Vienna; period of Austrian Verona begins.
- 1822 – 20 October: International diplomatic congress held in Verona at the close of the Napoleonic Wars.
- 1825 – Cassa di Risparmio di Verona, Vicenza, Belluno e Ancona (bank) established.
- 1829 – Cimitero monumentale di Verona (cemetery) designed.
- 1833 – Sistema difensivo di Verona (fortification) construction begins.
- 1847 – Verona Porta Vescovo railway station opens.
- 1848
  - 6 May: Battle of Santa Lucia fought near city.
  - Palazzo Barbieri built.
- 1851 – Verona Porta Nuova railway station built.
- 1852 – Ponte della Ferrovia (Verona) (bridge) built.
- 1866
  - October: Verona becomes part of the Kingdom of Italy per Treaty of Vienna (1866).
  - 18 November: King of Italy Victory Emmanuel visits city.
  - L'Arena newspaper begins publication.
- 1867
  - Banca Popolare di Verona (bank) founded
  - Giulio Camuzzoni becomes mayor.
- 1881 – Tranvia Verona-Caldiero-San Bonifacio (railway) begins operating.
- 1882 – September: Verona flood of 1882.
- 1887 – Canale Camuzzoni built.
- 1888 – Fedrigoni paper mill in business.
- 1897 – Population: 72,860.
- 1898 – Verona fair begins.

== 20th century ==
- 1903 – Hellas Verona F.C. (football club) formed.
- 1911 – Population: 81,909.
- 1913 – Arena di Verona Festival begins.
- 1919 – 2 August: 1919 Verona Caproni Ca.48 crash.
- 1921 – Virtus Verona football club formed.
- 1931 – Ponte della Vittoria (Verona) (bridge) built.
- 1941 – Archivio di Stato di Verona (state archives) established.
- 1943 – November: National congress of the Republican Fascist Party held in Verona.
- 1944 – January: Trial and execution of anti-Mussolini leaders takes place in Verona.
- 1945 – Bombing of Verona in World War II.
- 1948 – Estate teatrale veronese (theatre festival) begins.
- 1963 – Stadio Marc'Antonio Bentegodi (stadium) opens.
- 1975 – Radio Verona begins broadcasting.
- 1978 – Sede del Banco Popolare built.
- 1982 – University of Verona founded.
- 1990 – Some of the 1990 FIFA World Cup football contest played in Verona.
- 1998 – National conference of Alleanza Nazionale political party held in Verona.

== 21st century ==
- 2007 – Local election held; Flavio Tosi becomes mayor.
- 2013 – Population: 253,409.
- 2026 – The city hosted the 2026 Winter Olympics closing ceremonies and the 2026 Winter Paralympics opening ceremonies.

== See also ==
- History of Verona
- List of mayors of Verona
- List of bishops of Verona
- List of Scaligeri lords of Verona, 1260–1404
- Timeline of the Republic of Venice, of which Verona was part 1405–1796
- Veneto history (it) (region)

Timelines of other cities in the macroregion of Northeast Italy:^{(it)}

- Emilia-Romagna region: Timeline of Bologna; Ferrara; Forlì; Modena; Parma; Piacenza; Ravenna; Reggio Emilia; Rimini
- Friuli-Venezia Giulia region: Timeline of Trieste
- Trentino-South Tyrol region: Timeline of Trento
- Veneto region: Timeline of Padua; Treviso; Venice; Vicenza

== Bibliography ==
=== in English ===
- William Henry Overall, ed. (1870). "Verona". Dictionary of Chronology. London: William Tegg. hdl:2027/uc2.ark:/13960/t9m32q949.
- William Smith, ed. (1872) [1854]. "Verona". Dictionary of Greek and Roman Geography. London: John Murray. hdl:2027/hvd.ah5cur.
- "Verona", Hand-book for Travellers in Northern Italy (16th ed.), London: John Murray, 1897, OCLC 2231483
- Umberto Cassuto (1906), "Verona", Jewish Encyclopedia, vol. 12, New York, hdl:2027/mdp.49015002282441
- Alethea Wiel (1907), Verona, Mediaeval Towns, London: J.M. Dent & Co., OCLC 150311124
- A.M. Allen (1910). History of Verona.
- Middleton, John Henry; Ashby, Thomas (1910). "Verona" . Encyclopædia Britannica. Vol. 27 (11th ed.). pp. 1033–1036.
- Arthur L. Frothingham (1910), "Verona", Roman Cities in Northern Italy and Dalmatia, London: J. Murray
- Benjamin Vincent (1910), "Verona", Haydn's Dictionary of Dates (25th ed.), London: Ward, Lock & Co., hdl:2027/uc2.ark:/13960/t41r6xh8t
- "Verona", Northern Italy (14th ed.), Leipzig: Karl Baedeker, 1913. + (1870 ed.)
- Philippe Barbour (1995). "Verona". In Trudy Ring; Robert M. Salkin (eds.). Southern Europe. International Dictionary of Historic Places. Vol. 3. Fitzroy Dearborn. pp. 757–764. ISBN 1884964052.
- Roy Domenico (2002). "Veneto: Verona". Regions of Italy: a Reference Guide to History and Culture. Greenwood. pp. 390+. ISBN 0313307334.
- Maureen C. Miller (2004). "Verona". In Christopher Kleinhenz (ed.). Medieval Italy: an Encyclopedia. Routledge. pp. 1134–1139. ISBN 0415939291.
- Maria Agata Pincelli (2013). "Verona: a model case in the study of relationships between members of religious orders and the government of the city". In Frances Andrews (ed.). Churchmen and Urban Government in Late Medieval Italy, c.1200–c.1450. Cambridge University Press. ISBN 9781107044265.

=== in Italian ===
- Maffei (1732). Verona illustrata (in Italian). Per Jacopo Vallarsi, e Pierantonio Berno. ISBN 9780889202511.
- Pier Zagata (1745). Cronica della citta di Verona (in Italian). 1745-1749
- Indicazione delle fabbriche, chiese, e pitture di Verona, o sia, Guida per li forestieri (in Italian). Tip. Bisesti. 1815.
- G. B. da Persico (1820). Descrizione di Verona e della sua provincia (in Italian).
- Carlo Lozzi (1887). "Storie de'Municipii: Verona". Biblioteca istorica della antica e nuova Italia (in Italian). Vol. 2. Imola. pp. 460–477. OCLC 12117233. (bibliography)
- Luigi Simeoni (1917). Verona; guida storico-artistica (in Italian) (4th ed.). R. Cabianca.
- Verona e il suo territorio (in Italian). Istituto per gli Studi Storici Veronesi. 1960-
