= Generali Italia =

Italian insurance company

Generali Italia S.p.A.
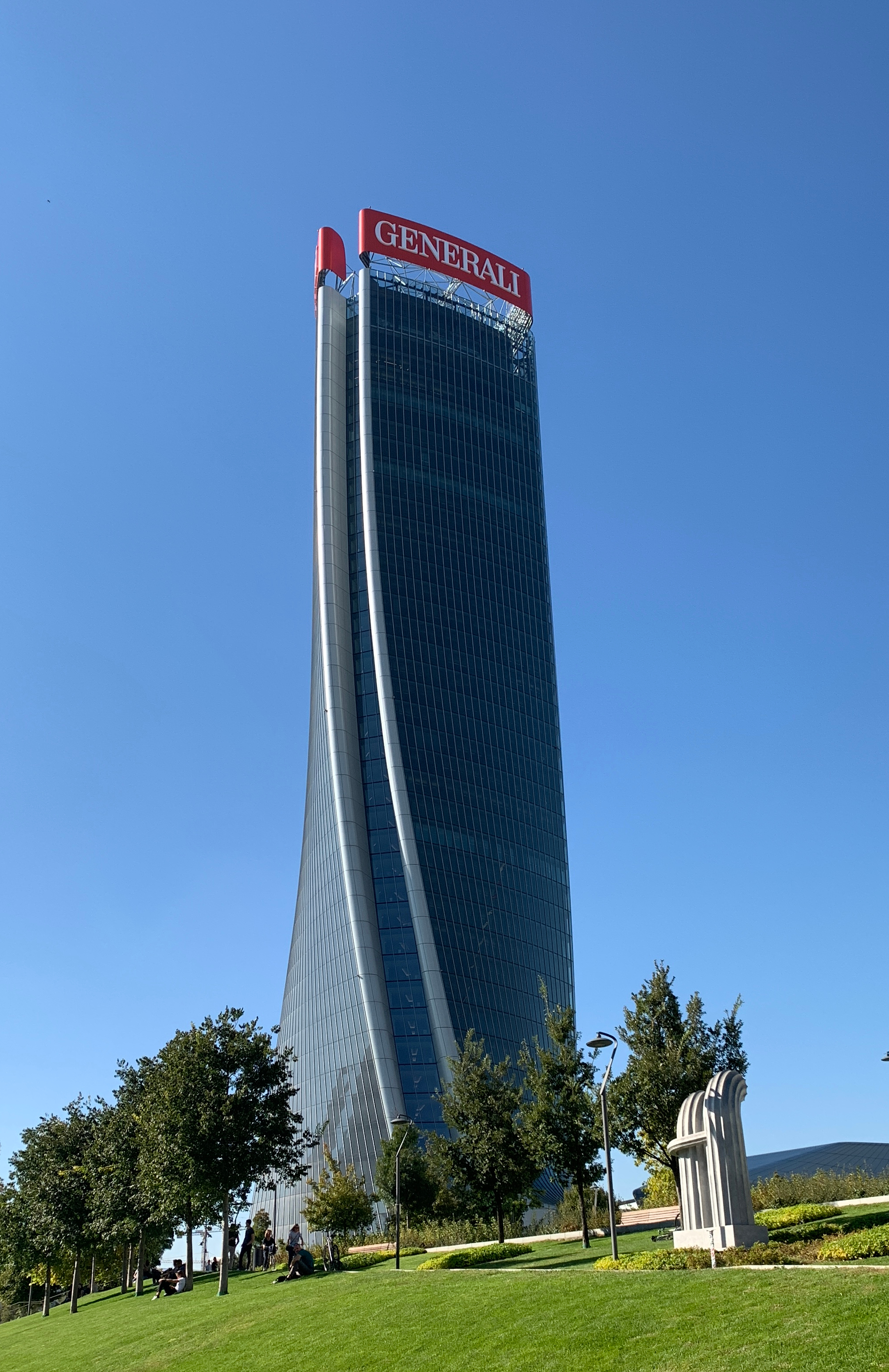
- Torre Hadid, Generali Italia headquarters in Milan
- Type: Subsidiary
- Industry: Financial services
- Founded: 2013; 13 years ago
- Headquarters: Mogliano Veneto, Italy
- Key people: Giancarlo Fancel (Country Manager Italy & CEO); Gianluca Perin (Country General Manager); Massimo Monacelli (General Manager)
- Products: Insurance, asset management
- Number of employees: 15,000
- Parent: Assicurazioni Generali
- Website: www.generali.it

Generali Italia S.p.A. or simply Generali is an Italian insurance company based in Mogliano Veneto, which is a subsidiary of Generali Group. Alleanza Assicurazioni, Cattolica Assicurazioni, DAS, Genertel, Generali Welion, Generali Jeniot and Leone Alato are headed by Generali Italia.

== History ==
The company was founded on July 1, 2013 when the Italian branch of Assicurazioni Generali was transferred to INA Assitalia and the name was changed to Generali Italia SpA. The insurance activities of the Toro Group (Toro, Lloyd Italico and Augusta) were then integrated. Sergio Balbinot was the first chairmen and Raffaele Agrusti the CEO; their office lasted until the approval of the 2013 financial statements. On 7 October 2013 Philippe Donnet joined the Generali Group and became Country Manager Italy and CEO of Generali Italia.

In May 2016 Marco Sesana was appointed Chief Executive Officer and General Manager.
In the following three years a new phase started and two new companies were born: Generali Welion, an integrated welfare company, and Generali Jeniot, which deals with IoT services and connected insurance.
In May 2020, IVASS, the supervisory entity for the sector, ordered Cattolica's top management to carry out a capital increase of 500 million by 30 October 2020. On 25 June 2020, Generali and Cattolica announce a strategic partnership which consists in the entry of Generali into Cattolica with a stake of 24.4 percent

In November 2021, Generali held 84.475 percent of Cattolica's share capital.

In 2022, the agrifood holding company Leone Alato was established, controlled by the Generali Italia. Leone Alato is involved in agricultural activities, including reforestation and the production and marketing of wines and spirits, as well as renewable energy production. Among its subsidiaries are notably Genagricola 1851 and Le Tenute del Leone Alato.
Later in September, Giancarlo Fancel, previously group Chief Risk Officer, was appointed Country Manager Italy and Chief Executive Officer.

On July 1, 2023, Cattolica initially became a division of Generali Italia, and later remained as a commercial brand of Generali Italia.

== Activities ==
Generali Italia, including its subsidiaries, has:

- 11 million customers
- € 30BN total premiums in 2025
- 15 thousand employees
- 40,000 distributors plus bancassurance.

== Subsidiaries ==
Insurance companies

- Alleanza Assicurazioni
- Genertel
- DAS

Service companies

- Generali Welion
- Generali Jeniot
- Leone Alato

== See also ==
- INA Assitalia
