= Genertel =

Italian insurance company

Genertel S.p.A.
- Formerly: Trieste e Venezia Assicurazioni S.p.A. (1994-1997); Trieste e Venezia Assicurazioni – Genertel S.p.A. (1997-2001)
- Type: Subsidiary
- Industry: Insurance
- Founded: July 1994; 32 years ago
- Founder: Assicurazioni Generali
- Headquarters: Trieste, Italy
- Key people: Andrea Mencattini (Chairman); Giacomo Trovato (CEO)
- Products: Insurances; Investment management
- Owner: Generali Italia (100%)
- Parent: Assicurazioni Generali
- Website: www.genertel.it

Genertel is an Italian online insurance company.

Founded in 1994 as Trieste e Venezia Assicurazioni, it is part of the Generali Group.

== History ==
Trieste e Venezia Assicurazioni was founded in Trieste in July 1994; it is the first company in Italy to provide financial services by telephone.

In 1997 changed its name to Trieste e Venezia Assicurazioni – Genertel.

In 1998 only five insurance companies were authorized to operate by telephone in Italy; among these, Genertel was the first in terms of premium amount and number of customers (more than 100,000).

In 1999 Genertel was the first direct insurance in Italy to offer the possibility of taking out policies on the Internet.

In 2001 changed its name to Genertel.

In 2005 Davide Passero became CEO of Genertel for almost a decade, until 2014 when he joined Alleanza Assicurazioni.

In June 2009, Generali launched Genertellife, the first online life insurance company in Italy, as an extension of Genertel.

In 2012, Fata Vita is merged by incorporation into Genertellife.

In 2014 there is a change at the top, Passero leaves the management of the company to Manlio Lostuzzi.

In 2019, Genertel was authorized by IVASS to operate also in the credit sector, where the company aims at the sector of the salary- or pension-backed loans.

On 1 September 2019 Maurizio Pescarini became CEO.

In 2020, to counter the emergency linked to the COVID-19 pandemic, Genertel launches "Genertel Everywhere" a completely remote contact center available 24 hours a day.

On 28 March 2023 IVASS authorized the merger between Genertel and Cattolica Assicurazioni. The latter was incorporated assuming the definitive name of Genertel on July 1, 2023.

In May 2024, the merger by incorporation of Genertellife into Alleanza Assicurazioni was announced, with the operation expected to be completed in 2025.

On 21 May 2024, Giacomo Trovato became CEO and general manager.

== Genertellife ==
Genertellife S.p.A.
- Type: Subsidiary
- Industry: Insurance
- Founded: 2009; 17 years ago
- Founder: Assicurazioni Generali
- Defunct: January 1, 2025
- Fate: Merged into Alleanza Assicurazioni
- Successor: Alleanza Assicurazioni
- Headquarters: Mogliano Veneto, Italy
- Key people: Andrea Mencattini (Chairman); Antonella Maier (CEO)
- Products: Life insurances; Investment management
- Owner: Generali Italia (100%)
- Parent: Assicurazioni Generali
- Website: www.genertellife.it

Genertellife was an Italian online insurance company. It is the extension of the non-life insurance provider Genertel.

Founded in 2009, it was part of the Generali Group.

In November 2023 Antonella Maier became CEO and general manager.

In May 2024, the merger by incorporation of Genertellife into Alleanza Assicurazioni was announced, with the operation completed in 2025.
