= Giorgio Zanotto =

Italian politician and banker (1920–1999)

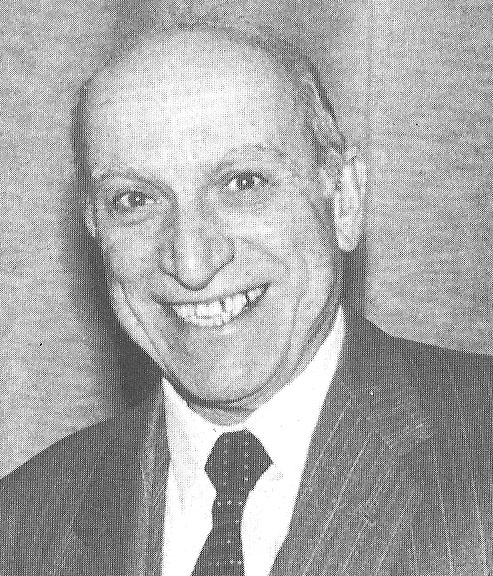

Mayor of Verona
- In office 1956–1965
- Preceded by: Giovanni Uberti
- Succeeded by: Renato Gozzi

President of the Province of Verona
- In office 1970–1975
- Preceded by: Angelo Tomelleri
- Succeeded by: Bruno Castelletti

Personal details
- Born: 19 December 1920 Verona, Kingdom of Italy
- Died: 24 October 1999 (aged 78) Verona, Veneto, Italy
- Party: Christian Democracy
- Education: Ca' Foscari University of Venice
- Profession: Banker, teacher, accountant

Giorgio Zanotto (19 December 1920 – 24 October 1999) was an Italian politician, business executive and banker. A member of Christian Democracy, he served as mayor of Verona from 1956 to 1965 and as president of the Province of Verona from 1970 to 1975.

Zanotto graduated in economics and commerce from Ca' Foscari University of Venice. He was president of Banca Popolare di Verona and a member of the executive committee of Cattolica Assicurazioni, where he later served as vice president.
