= Renato Gozzi =

Italian politician (1915–1999)

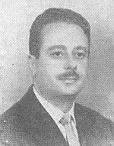

Mayor of Verona
- In office 1975–1980
- Preceded by: Carlo Delaini
- Succeeded by: Gabriele Sboarina
- In office 1965–1970
- Preceded by: Giorgio Zanotto
- Succeeded by: Carlo Delaini

President of the Province of Verona
- In office 1961–1965
- Preceded by: Luigi Buffatti
- Succeeded by: Angelo Tomelleri

Member of the Chamber of Deputies
- In office 25 June 1953 – 11 June 1958

Mayor of Grezzana
- In office 1946–1955

Personal details
- Born: 21 March 1915 Verona, Kingdom of Italy
- Died: 28 February 1999 (aged 83)
- Party: Christian Democracy
- Profession: Lawyer

Renato Gozzi (21 March 1915 – 28 February 1999) was an Italian politician and lawyer. A member of Christian Democracy, he served as a member of the Chamber of Deputies from 1953 to 1958. Gozzi was mayor of Grezzana from 1946 to 1955 and president of the Province of Verona from 1961 to 1965. He subsequently served as mayor of Verona from 1965 to 1970 and again from 1975 to 1980.
