= Cattolica Assicurazioni =

Italian insurance company

- Formerly: Società Cattolica di Assicurazione Soc. Coop. (1896-2020)
- Company type: Subsidiary
- Industry: Insurance
- Founded: February 27, 1896
- Founder: Nicolò Rezzara; Cesare Algranati; Stanislao Medolago Albani; Giuseppe Tovini
- Defunct: June 30, 2023
- Fate: Merged into Genertel
- Successor: Genertel
- Headquarters: Trieste, Italy
- Area served: Italy
- Products: Insurances
- Revenue: 5,793,132 euro (2018)
- Net income: 3,527,196 euro (2018)
- Owner: Generali Italia (100%)
- Number of employees: 1,692 (2018)

Cattolica Assicurazioni was an Italian insurance company, acquired by Generali Italia in 2022 and merged with Genertel in 2023. The company was listed on the FTSE Italia Mid Cap index of the Milan Stock Exchange from November 27, 2000, to August 12, 2022 (ISIN Code: IT0000784154, Ticker: CASS).

== History ==
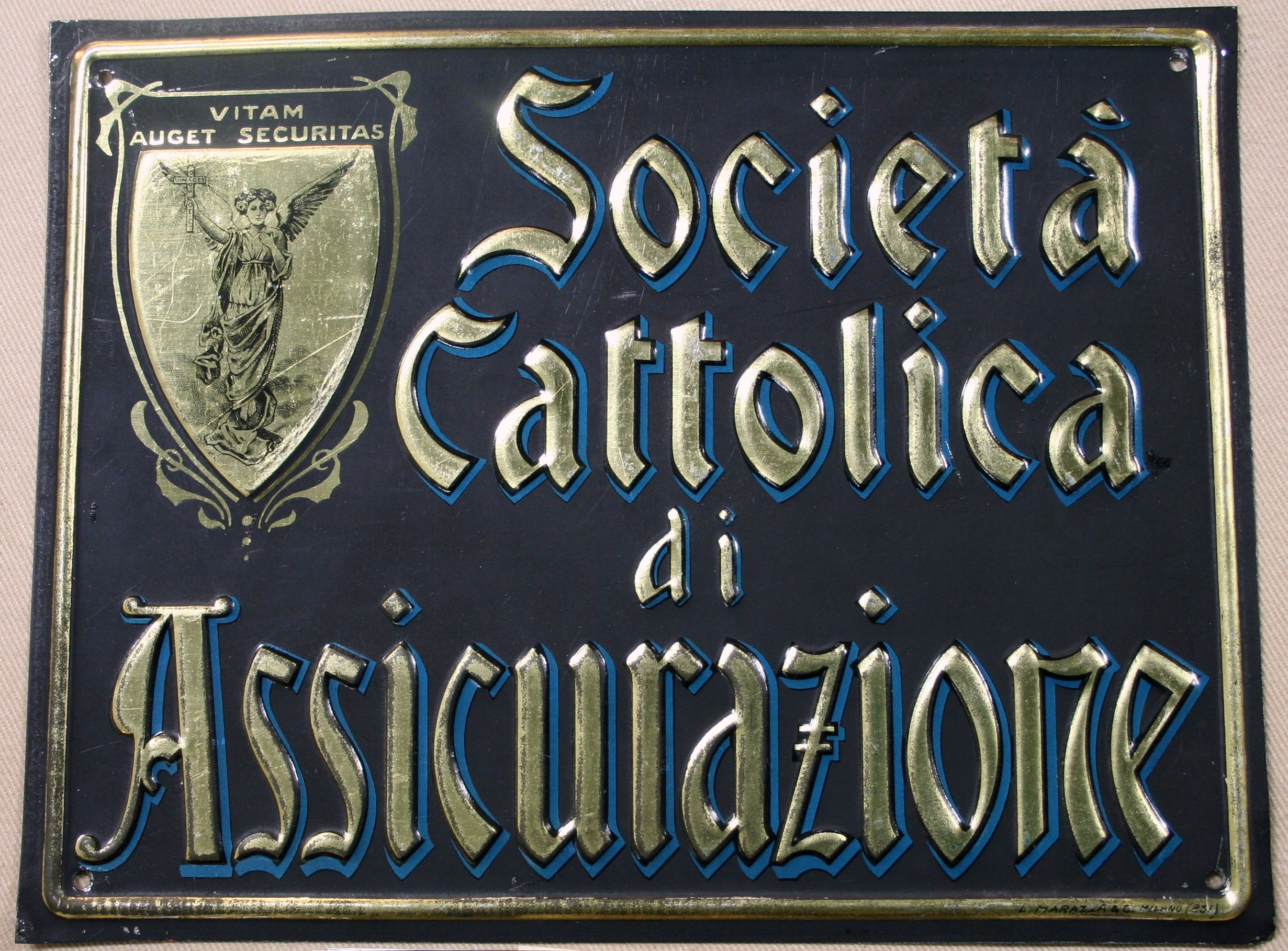
Former logo

Società Cattolica d'Assicurazione was founded in Verona on February 27, 1896, as a cooperative, inspired by the social doctrine of the Catholic Church and the 1891 encyclical Rerum Novarum.

Among the 34 founding members and 36 shareholders were Nicolò Rezzara, Cesare Algranati, Stanislao Medolago Albani, and Giuseppe Tovini. Its purpose was to protect small landowners from hail and weather damage, reflected in its symbol (an angel with the Latin motto "vitam auget securitas" – safety increases life). The company provided both economic and social functions.

In 1898, the fire insurance branch was opened, and in 1900, the company's activities expanded to include life insurance policies. However, the life insurance branch was closed in 1912 with the establishment of INA and its monopoly.

The period around World War I was difficult due to the war and the spread of phylloxera.

After the life insurance monopoly ended, Cattolica reopened its life insurance branch in 1924. In the following decades, the company continued to grow and diversify its activities and sales channels.

In the post-war period, it remained the only Italian insurance company to retain a cooperative structure.

=== Cattolica Group ===
In 1976, with Verona Assicurazioni, Cattolica began to expand and grow its market presence through a network of multi-mandate agents.

In the 1990s, Cattolica was among the first insurance companies to adopt a multichannel commercial strategy, adding bancassurance alongside agencies. In 1989, it promoted the establishment of Arca Vita, and in 1996, Risparmio e Previdenza was founded. Also in 1996, Cattolica Aziende was created, dedicated to large industries.

In 2000, the company was listed on the Milan Stock Exchange and established two new life insurance companies: BPV Vita and Lombarda Vita. Around the same time, Duomo Assicurazioni, Maeci, Maeci Vita, and Duomo Previdenza joined the group.

In 2003, TUA Assicurazioni was founded, the Cattolica Group's company dedicated to innovation, followed in 2006 by the establishment of Fondazione Cattolica Assicurazioni, representing the company's social responsibility.

In 2007, Banca Popolare di Vicenza, led by Gianni Zonin, acquired an 8% stake in Cattolica, which increased to 15% in 2014.

In 2012, Cattolica acquired the Ca' Tron estate, which dates back to the 16th century and was originally established by the Tron family as a farming estate. The property spans 2,000 hectares and hosts the campus of a business incubator (H-Farm).

In 2013, Cattolica acquired 100% of Fata Assicurazioni from Generali.

In 2014, the Religious and Non-Profit Entities Observatory was founded, serving as an informational tool for the Religious Entities and Third Sector business unit. In June 2017, Alberto Minali, a former Generali executive, replaced Giovan Battista Mazzucchelli as CEO, leading to a renewal of the company's management team.

Following the liquidation of Banca Popolare di Vicenza, in October 2017, American financier Warren Buffett acquired 15.7 million shares, making Berkshire Hathaway the largest shareholder of the company, with a 9.05% stake.

In April 2018, a governance shift occurred: while maintaining its cooperative model, the shareholder meeting voted to open the company to capital shareholders, allowing them representation on the board of directors. In October 2019, the Board revoked Alberto Minali's executive powers and appointed general manager Carlo Ferraresi as CEO.

In May 2020, Ivass (the sector's regulatory body) ordered Cattolica's leadership to implement a €500 million capital increase by October 30, 2020, due to solvency risks.

=== Cattolica becomes a Joint Stock Company ===
The fragmented shareholding of the cooperative made it difficult to quickly address the required capital increase. On June 25, 2020, Generali and Cattolica announced a strategic partnership, with Generali becoming the largest shareholder (24.4%) through a reserved capital increase of €300 million, conditional on Cattolica's transformation into a joint-stock company.

On July 30, 2020, Cattolica's shareholders approved the conversion to a joint-stock company, with 70.7% of the votes, and completed on April 1, 2021. Following the success of the takeover bid launched by Generali, on November 5, 2021, Generali became the controlling shareholder of Cattolica Assicurazioni with an 84.475% stake, which increased to 95.112% by July 2022.

On August 12, 2022, the listing and trading of the shares of the insurance company on the Milan Stock Exchange were revoked, as it was fully acquired by Generali for a total expenditure of approximately €1.4 billion.

Cattolica's activities did not stop, and in September 2022, a research study titled "The Evolving Non-Profit. First Report on Insurance Needs, Choices, and Requirements of Entities", conducted by the company in collaboration with the Catholic University of the Sacred Heart, was presented; the report explores a strategic and underrepresented sector.

On March 28, 2023, IVASS authorized the merger of Genertel into Cattolica Assicurazioni, with the definitive renaming to Genertel. The legal headquarters was moved to Trieste.

As of July 1, 2023, Cattolica Assicurazioni became a division of Generali Italia and continues to operate under its own brand.
