= List of mayors of Verona =

Mayor of Verona
- Sindaco di Verona

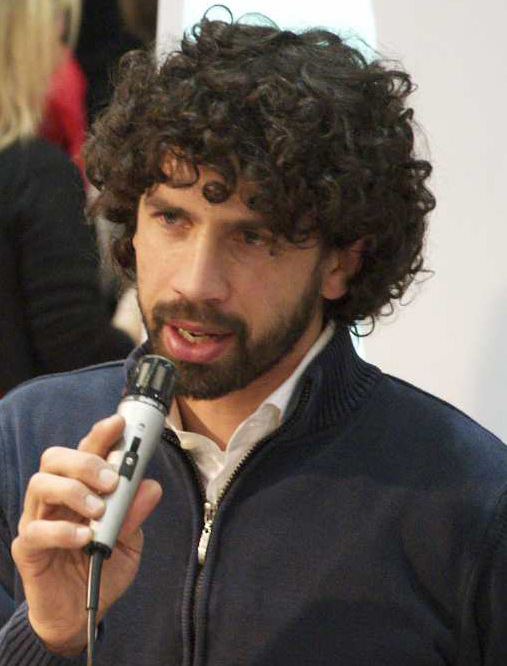
- Incumbent; Damiano Tommasi since 29 June 2022
- Style: No courtesy, title or style
- Seat: Palazzo Barbieri
- Appointer: Popular election
- Term length: 5 years, renewable once
- Inaugural holder: Alessandro Carlotti
- Formation: 1866
- Salary: € 6,767 (monthly)
- Website: www.comune.verona.it

The mayor of Verona (Italian: Sindaco di Verona) is an elected politician who, along with Verona's city council, is accountable for the government of Verona in Veneto, Italy.

The current mayor of Verona is Damiano Tommasi, a centre-left independent, who took office on 29 June 2022.

== Overview ==
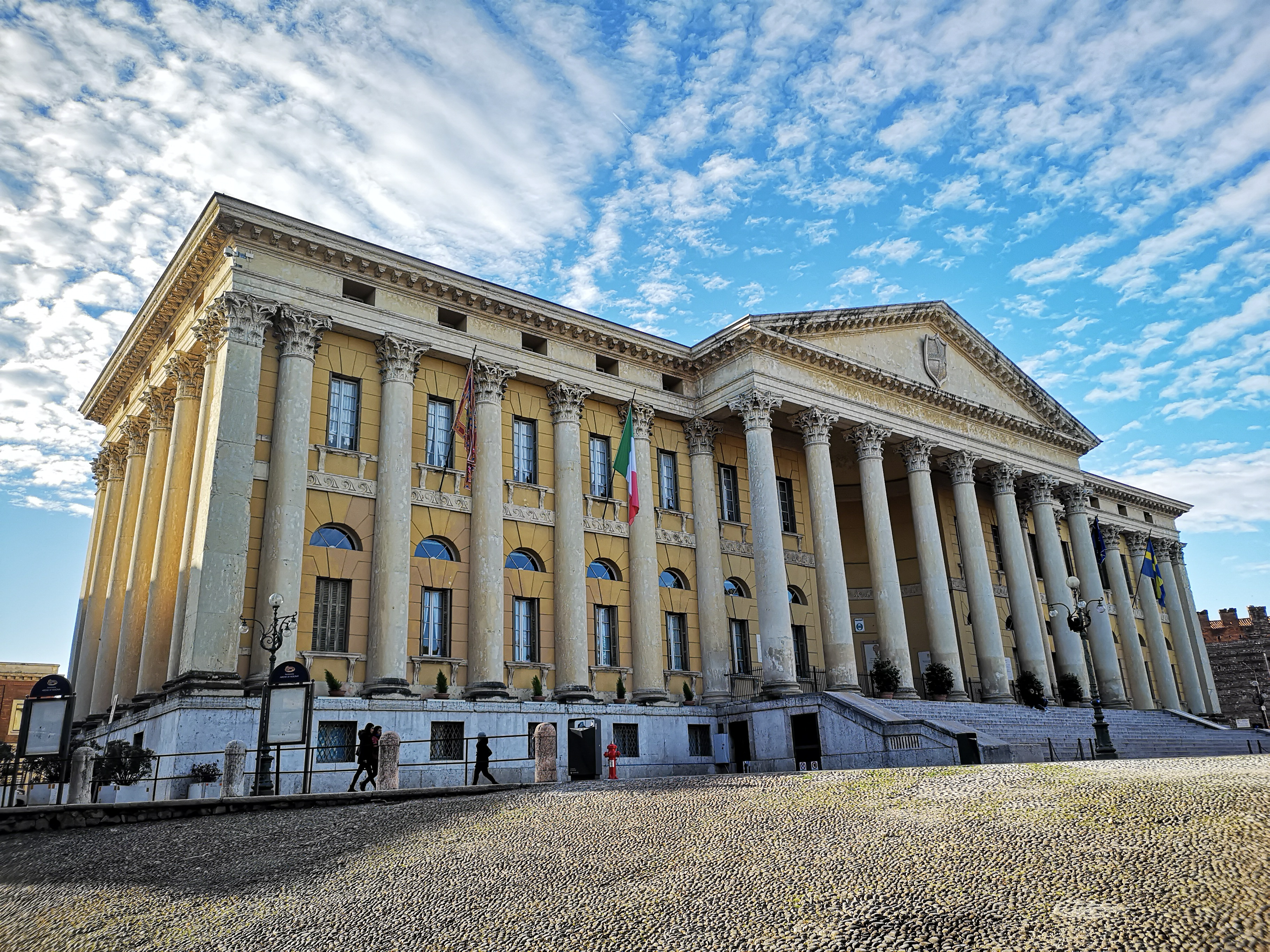

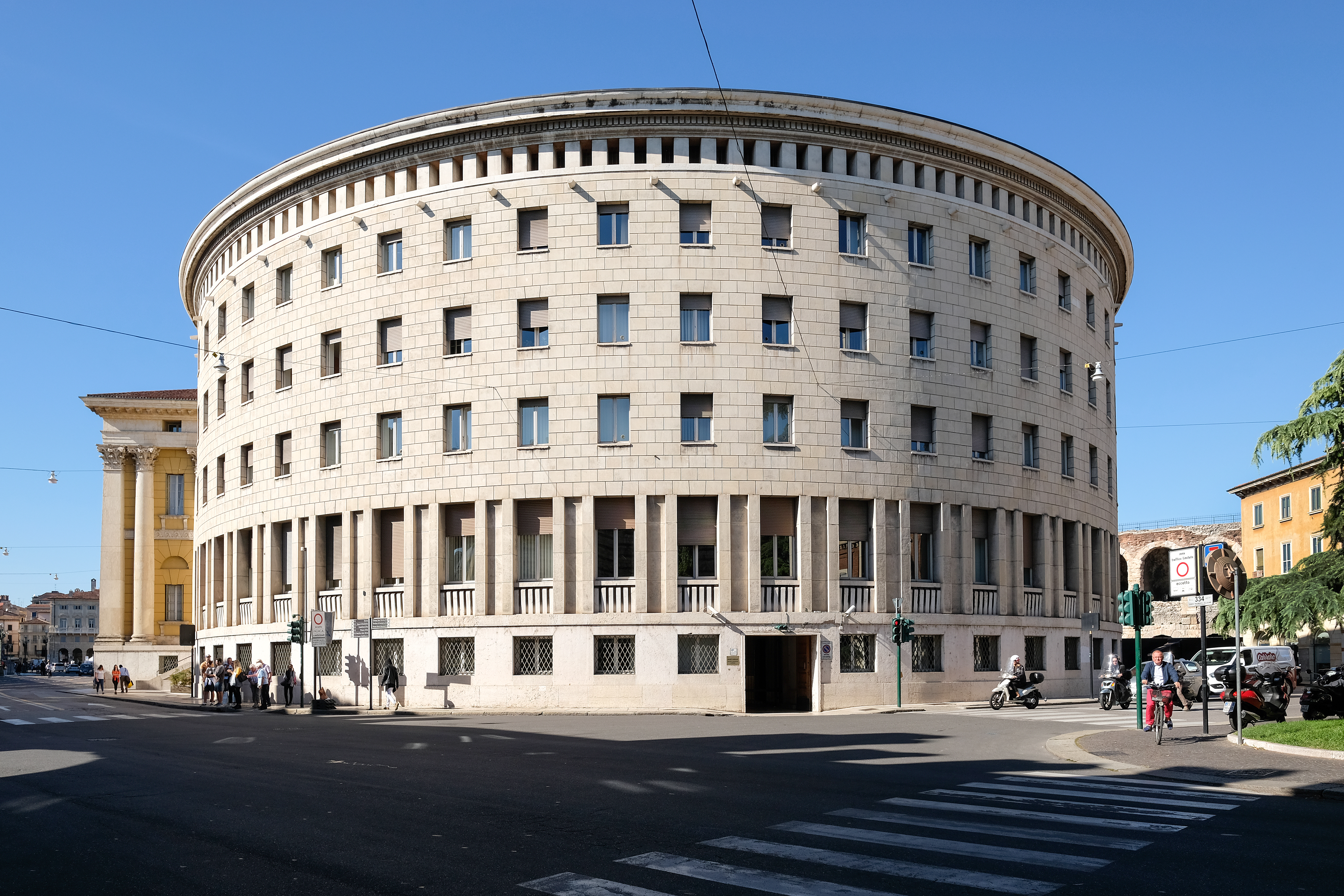
Palazzo Barbieri is Verona's City Hall.

From 1866, when the former Kingdom of Lombardy–Venetia (part of the Austrian Empire) was annexed to the Kingdom of Italy, the central government created the mayor's office, chosen by city council.

In 1926, the Fascist Italy replaced the mayor with a Podestà, chosen by National Fascist Party. After the fall of the Italian Social Republic and the end of the Nazi Germany's occupation, the Mayor was re-established.

From 1994, the mayor is chosen by the citizens of Verona, originally for a four-year term. In 2000 the term was extended to five years.

== List ==
=== Kingdom of Italy (1866–1946) ===
In 1866, after the Third War of Independence and the subsequent annexion of Veneto to the Kingdom of Italy, the national government created the office of the mayor of Verona (Sindaco di Verona), chosen by the city council. In 1926, the Fascist dictatorship abolished mayors and City councils, replacing them with an authoritarian Podestà chosen by the National Fascist Party.

	Mayor	Term start	Term end	Party
1	Alessandro Carlotti	1866	1867	Independent
2	Giulio Camuzzoni	1867	1883	Right
3	Antonio Guglielmi	1883	1887	Right
4	Giovanni Battista Albertini	1887	1888	Right
5	Antonio Perez	1888	1889	Right
6	Augusto Renzi Tessari	1889	1891	Right
7	Augusto Caperle	1891	1895	Right
(3)	Antonio Guglielmi	1895	1907	Right
8	Luigi Bellini Carnesali	1907	1909	Right
9	Eugenio Gallizioli	1909	1914	PRI
10	Tullio Zanella	1914	1920	PSI
11	Albano Pontedera	1920	1922	PSI
12	Vittorio Raffaldi	1922	1926	PNF
Fascist Podestà (1926–1945)
1	Vittorio Raffaldi	1926	1928	PNF
2	Filippo Nereo Vignola	1928	1930	PNF
3	Mario Pasti	1930	1930	PNF
4	Luigi Marenzi	1930	1933	PNF
5	Alberto Donella	1933	1943	PNF
6	Luigi Grancelli	1943	1945	PFR
Liberation (1945–1946)
13	Aldo Fedeli	1945	1946	PSI

=== Republic of Italy (1946–present) ===
==== City Council election (1946–1994) ====
From 1946 to 1994, the Mayor of Verona was chosen by the City Council.

	Mayor	Term start	Term end	Party	Coalition	Election
1	Aldo Fedeli (1895–1955)	1946	1951	PSI	PCI • PSI	1946
2	Giovanni Uberti (1888–1964)	1951	1956	DC	DC • PLI • PSDI	1951
3	Giorgio Zanotto (1920–1999)	1956	1960	DC	DC • PLI • PSDI	1956
3	Giorgio Zanotto (1920–1999)	1960	1965	DC	DC • PLI • PSDI	1960
4	Renato Gozzi (1915–1999)	1965	1970	DC	DC • PSI • PSDI	1964
5	Carlo Delaini (1927–2008)	1970	1971	DC	DC • PSI • PSDI	1970
6	Leonzio Veggio (1922–2019)	1971	1973	DC	DC • PSI • PSDI	1970
(5)	Carlo Delaini (1927–2008)	1973	1975	DC	DC • PSI • PSDI	1970
(4)	Renato Gozzi (1915–1999)	1975	1980	DC	DC • PSI • PSDI	1975
7	Gabriele Sboarina (b. 1935)	1980	1985	DC	DC • PSI • PSDI • PRI • PLI	1980
7	Gabriele Sboarina (b. 1935)	1985	1990	DC	DC • PSI • PSDI • PRI • PLI	1985
8	Aldo Sala (b. 1945)	1990	1993	DC	DC • PSI • PRI • PSDI • PLI	1990
9	Enzo Erminero (1931–2023)	1993	1993	DC	DC • PSI • PSDI • PLI	1990
Special Prefectural Commissioner tenure (1 December 1993 – 27 June 1994)

==== Direct election (since 1994) ====
Since 1994, enacting a new law on local administrations (1993), the Mayor of Verona is chosen by direct election, originally every four, and since 2002 every five years.

	Mayor of Verona	Took office	Left office	Party	Coalition	Election
10	Michela Sironi Mariotti (b. 1946)	27 June 1994	25 June 1998	FI	Pole of Freedoms (FI-AN-LN-CCD)	1994
10	Michela Sironi Mariotti (b. 1946)	25 June 1998	12 June 2002	FI	Pole for Freedoms (FI-AN-CDU-CCD)	1998
11	Paolo Zanotto (b. 1953)	12 June 2002	28 May 2007	Ind	The Olive Tree (DL-DS-FdV-SDI-PdCI)	2002
12	Flavio Tosi (b. 1969)	28 May 2007	12 May 2012	LN; F!	House of Freedoms (FI-AN-LN-UDC)	2007
12	Flavio Tosi (b. 1969)	12 May 2012	27 June 2017	LN; F!	LN and right-wing lists	2012
13	Federico Sboarina (b. 1971)	27 June 2017	29 June 2022	FdI	FI • FdI • LN	2017
14	Damiano Tommasi (b. 1974)	29 June 2022	In office	Ind	PD • SI and left-wing lists	2022

== Elections ==
=== Mayoral and City Council election, 1994 ===
The election took place on two rounds: the first on 12 June, the second on 26 June 1994.

Results

Summary of the 1994 Verona City Council election results
Parties and coalitions		Votes	%	Seats
Forza Italia (Note: Including Christian Democratic Centre (CCD).)	FI	45,235	28.58	14
Lega Nord (Note: Endorsed the candidate only on the second round.)	LN	28,261	17.86	9
National Alliance (Alleanza Nazionale) (Note: Endorsed the candidate only on the second round.)	AN	15,565	9.84	5
Others		1.591	1.00	0
Sironi Mariotti coalition (Centre-right)		90,652	57.28	28
Democratic Party of the Left (Partito Democratico della Sinistra)	PDS	16,157	10.21	5
Communist Refoundation Party (Rifondazione Comunista)	PRC	6,640	4.20	2
Federation of the Greens (Federazione dei Verdi)	FdV	5,434	3.43	1
Others		4,245	2.68	1
Donella coalition (Left)		32,476	20.52	9
Italian People's Party (Partito Popolare Italiano)	PPI	24,473	15.46	7
Segni Pact (Patto Segni)	PS	5,315	3.36	1
Lega Autonomia Veneta	LAV	4,308	2.72	1
Others		1,034	0.65	0
Total		158,258	100.00	46
Votes cast / turnout		179,612	81.97	
Registered voters		219,109		
Source: Ministry of the Interior

Candidate	Party	Coalition	First round		Second round	
Candidate	Party	Coalition	Votes	%	Votes	%
Michela Sironi Mariotti	FI	FI-CCD	50,314	29.50	74,032	61.51
Dario Donella	PDS	PDS-PRC-FdV	38,610	22.64	46,316	38.49
Giovanni Maccagnani	LN		29,461	17.27		
Gian Antonio Vaccaro	PPI		24,629	14.44		
Massimo Galli Righi	AN		16,242	9.52		
Elmo Padovani	PS		5,647	3.31		
Massimo Guerra	LAV		4,553	2.67		
Antonio Barzon	Ind		1,107	0.65		
Eligible voters			219,109	100.00	219,109	100.00
Voted			179,612	81.97	128,182	58.50
Blank or invalid ballots			9,049		7,834	
Total valid votes			170,563		120,348	

=== Mayoral and City Council election, 1998 ===
The election took place on two rounds: the first on 24 May, the second on 7 June 1998.

Results

Summary of the 1998 Verona City Council election results
Parties and coalitions		Votes	%	Seats
Forza Italia	FI	27,774	21.60	16
National Alliance (Alleanza Nazionale)	AN	10,899	8.48	6
Christian Democratic Centre (Centro Cristiano Democratico)	CCD	6,741	5.24	4
United Christian Democrats (Cristiano Democratici Uniti)	CDU	3,762	2.93	2
Sironi Mariotti coalition (Centre-right)		49,176	38.24	28
Democrats of the Left (Democratici di Sinistra)	DS	15,618	12.15	5
Italian People's Party (Partito Popolare Italiano)	PPI	10,183	7.92	3
Communist Refoundation Party (Rifondazione Comunista)	PRC	5,223	4.06	1
Italian Democratic Socialists (Socialisti Democratici Italiani)	SDI	3,983	3.10	1
Others		4,915	3.82	0
Brugnoli coalition (Centre-left)		39,922	31.05	10
Lega Nord	LN	21,948	17.07	5
Others		17,547	13.65	3
Total		128,593	100.00	46
Votes cast / turnout		159,793	73.97	
Registered voters		216,014		
Source: Ministry of the Interior

Candidate	Party	Coalition	First round		Second round	
Candidate	Party	Coalition	Votes	%	Votes	%
Michela Sironi Mariotti	FI	Pole for Freedoms	60,772	40.28	64,604	58.33
Giuseppe Brugnoli	DS	The Olive Tree	46,100	30.56	46,160	41.67
Francesco Girondini	LN		24,053	15.94		
Tito Brunelli	Ind		5,544	3.67		
Massimo Guerra	LAV	LAV-RI	4,558	3.02		
Others			9,844	6.53		
Eligible voters			216,014	100.00	216,014	100.00
Voted			159,793	73.97	113,842	52.70
Blank or invalid ballots			8,922		3,078	
Total valid votes			150,871		128,593	

=== Mayoral and City Council election, 2002 ===
The election took place on two rounds: the first on 26–27 May, the second on 9–10 June 2002.

Results

Summary of the 2002 Verona City Council election results
Parties and coalitions		Votes	%	Seats
Forza Italia	FI	32,670	24.50	10
National Alliance (Alleanza Nazionale)	AN	13,154	9.86	3
Union of the Centre (Unione di Centro)	UDC	9,141	6.14	2
Lega Nord	LN	8,191	6.14	2
Bolla coalition (Centre-right)		63,156	47.35	17 (Note: Even if the coalition received the most votes, its mayoral candidate lost the election on the second round. As a consequence, the coalition didn't win the majority bonus which was instead awarded to the coalition whose mayoral candidate won the run-off.)
The Daisy (La Margherita)	DL	17,366	13.02	9
Democrats of the Left (Democratici di Sinistra) (Note: Including Italian Democratic Socialists (SDI) and Party of Italian Communists (PdCI).)	DS	16,535	12.40	9
For Verona (Per Verona)		11,884	8.91	6
Defend Verona (Difendi Verona) (Note: Endorsed the candidate only on the second round.)		7,067	5.30	3
Federation of the Greens (Federazione dei Verdi)	FdV	2,461	1.85	1
Zanotto coalition (Centre-left)		55,313	41.47	28 (Note: Awarded the majority bonus since its mayoral candidate won the run-off.)
Communist Refoundation Party (Rifondazione Comunista)	PRC	4,170	3.13	1
Others		10,733	8.05	0
Total		133,372	100.00	46
Votes cast / turnout		157,382	74.14	
Registered voters		212,284		
Source: Ministry of the Interior

Candidate	Party	Coalition	First round		Second round	
Candidate	Party	Coalition	Votes	%	Votes	%
Pierluigi Bolla	FI	House of Freedoms	68,935	45.64	63,889	45.77
Paolo Zanotto	DL	The Olive Tree	58,506	38.73	75,711	54.23
Aventino Frau	Ind		7,733	5.12		
Fiorenzo Fasoli	PRC		4,106	2.72		
Roberto Bussinello	FN		2,424	1.60		
Fabrizio Comencini	LVR		1,913	1.27		
Antonio Borghesi	IdV		1,882	1.25		
Others			5,547	3.67		
Eligible voters			212,284	100.00	212,284	100.00
Voted			157,382	74.14	141,823	66.81
Blank or invalid ballots			6,336		2,223	
Total valid votes			151,046		139,600	

=== Mayoral and City Council election, 2007 ===
The election took place on 27–28 May 2007.

Results

Summary of the 2007 Verona City Council election results
Parties and coalitions		Votes	%	Seats
Tosi List (Lista Tosi)		22,482	16.38	8
Forza Italia	FI	20,681	15.07	8
National Alliance (Alleanza Nazionale)	AN	17,861	13.02	6
Lega Nord	LN	16,417	11.96	6
Union of the Centre (Unione di Centro)	UDC	6,277	4.57	2
Others		925	0.67	0
Tosi coalition (Centre-right)		84,643	61.68	30
The Olive Tree (L'Ulivo)		23,860	17.39	10
Zanotto List (Lista Zanotto)		12,805	9.33	5
Party of Italian Communists (Partito dei Comunisti Italiani)	PdCI	2,743	2.00	1
Others		5,183	3.77	0
Zanotto coalition (Centre-left)		44,591	32.49	16
Others		7,991	5.83	0
Total		137,225	100.00	46
Votes cast / turnout		157,378	76.69	
Registered voters		205,207		
Source: Ministry of the Interior

Candidate	Party	Coalition	First round	
Candidate	Party	Coalition	Votes	%
Flavio Tosi	LN	House of Freedoms	92,943	60.75
Paolo Zanotto	DL	The Union	51,828	33.87
Others			8,227	5.38
Eligible voters			205,207	100.00
Voted			157,378	76.69
Blank or invalid ballots			4,380	
Total valid votes			152,998	

=== Mayoral and City Council election, 2012 ===
The election took place on 6–7 May 2012.

Results

Summary of the 2012 Verona City Council election results
Parties and coalitions		Votes	%	Seats
Tosi List (Lista Tosi)		45,327	37.22	17
Lega Nord	LN	13,065	10.73	5
Others		8,728	7.09	0
Tosi coalition (Right)		67,030	55.04	22
Democratic Party (Partito Democratico)	PD	18,075	14.84	6
Left Ecology Freedom (Sinistra Ecologia Libertà)	SEL	3,260	2.68	2
Others		7,030	5.77	0
Bertucco coalition (Centre-left)		28,365	23.29	8
Five Star Movement (Movimento Cinque Stelle)	M5S	11,584	9.51	3
The People of Freedom (Il Popolo della Libertà)	PdL	6,447	5.29	2
Union of the Centre (Unione di Centro)	UDC	4,075	3.35	1
Others		2,546	2.09	0
Castelletti coalition (Centre-right)		13,068	10.73	3
Others		1,730	1.42	0
Total		121,777	100.00	36
Votes cast / turnout		139,531	69.65	
Registered voters		200,338		
Source: Ministry of the Interior

Candidate	Party	Coalition	First round	
Candidate	Party	Coalition	Votes	%
Flavio Tosi	LN		76,904	57.33
Michele Bertucco	SEL	PD-SEL-IdV-PRC	30,493	22.73
Gianni Benciolini	M5S		12,513	9.33
Luigi Castelletti	PdL	PdL-UDC-FLI	11,915	8.88
Luca Castellini	FN		1,023	0.76
Barry Ibrahima	PdAC		951	0.71
Patrizia Badii	Ind		349	0.26
Eligible voters			200,338	100.00
Voted			139,531	69.65
Blank or invalid ballots			5,383	
Total valid votes			134,148	

=== Mayoral and City Council election, 2017 ===
The election took place on two rounds: the first on 11 June, the second on 25 June 2017.

Results

Summary of the 2017 Verona City Council election results
Parties and coalitions		Votes	%	Seats
Sboarina List (Lista Sboarina)		14,978	13.63	11
Lega Nord	LN	9,704	8.83	7
Forza Italia	FI	3,763	3.42	2
Brothers of Italy (Fratelli d'Italia)	FdI	2,991	2.72	2
Others		1,158	1.05	0
Sboarina coalition (Centre-right)		32,594	29.65	22
Tosi List (Lista Tosi)		17,969	16.35	4
Love Verona (Ama Verona)	AV	4,614	4.20	1
Act! (Fare!)	F!	3,025	2.75	0
Others		1,037	0.94	0
Bisinella coalition (Centre-right)		26,645	24.24	5
Democratic Party (Partito Democratico)	PD	17,406	15.83	4
Civic Verona (Verona Civica)	VC	5,579	5.08	1
Others		943	0.86	0
Salemi coalition (Centre-left)		23,928	21.77	5
Five Star Movement (Movimento Cinque Stelle)	M5S	10,386	9.45	2
Clean Verona (Verona Pulita)	VP	5,315	4.84	1
Verona in Common (Verona in Comune)	ViC	4,824	4.39	1
Others		6,231	5.67	0
Total		109,923	100.00	36
Votes cast / turnout		118,076	58.81	
Registered voters		200,767		
Source: Ministry of the Interior

Candidate	Party	Coalition	First round		Second round	
Candidate	Party	Coalition	Votes	%	Votes	%
Federico Sboarina	FdI	FI-LN-FdI	33,440	29.13	46,962	58.11
Patrizia Bisinella	F!		26,946	23.47	33,848	41.89
Orietta Salemi	PD		25,724	22.41		
Alessandro Gennari	M5S		10,891	9.49		
Michele Croce	Ind		5,803	5.06		
Michele Bertucco	SI	SI-PRC	5,288	4.61		
Filippo Grigolini	PdF		3,925	3.42		
Marco Giorlo	Ind		1,538	1.34		
Roberto Bussinello	CP		1,234	1.08		
Eligible voters			200,767	100.00	200,767	100.00
Voted			118,076	58.81	85,112	42.39
Blank or invalid ballots			3,287		4,302	
Total valid votes			114,789		80,810	

=== Mayoral and City Council election, 2022 ===
The election took place on two rounds: the first on 12 June, the second on 26 June 2022.

Results

Summary of the 2022 Verona City Council election results
Parties and coalitions		Votes	%	Seats
Tommasi List (Lista Tommasi)		16,452	15.97	10
Democratic Party (Partito Democratico)	PD	13,500	13.10	8
Goals (Traguardi)		5,724	5.55	3
Civic Ecologic Left (Sinistra Civica Ecologista)	SCE	2,619	2.54	1
Others		1,378	2.30	0
Tommasi coalition (Centre-left)		40,673	39.47	22
Brothers of Italy (Fratelli d'Italia)	FdI	12,278	11.91	4
Sboarina List (Lista Sboarina)		7,548	7.32	2
League (Lega)	L	6,797	6.60	1
Coraggio Italia	CI	5,381	5.22	1
Others		2,397	2.32	0
Sboarina coalition (Right)		34,401	33.38	8
Tosi List (Lista Tosi)		10,937	10.61	4
Act! (Fare!)	F!	4,548	4.41	1
Forza Italia	FI	4,479	4.35	1
Others		4,306	4.18	0
Tosi coalition (Centre-right)		24,270	23.55	6
Others		3,728	3.61	0
Total		103,049	100.00	36
Votes cast / turnout		111,606	55.08	
Registered voters		202,638		
Source: Ministry of the Interior

Candidate	Party	Coalition	First round		Second round	
Candidate	Party	Coalition	Votes	%	Votes	%
Damiano Tommasi	Ind	PD-SI-EV-A-+E	43,106	39.80	50,118	53.40
Federico Sboarina	FdI	FdI-L-CI	35,404	32.69	43,730	46.60
Flavio Tosi	FI	FI-F!	25,843	23.86		
Alberto Zelger	PdF		2,857	2.64		
Anna Sautto	3V		646	0.60		
Paola Barollo	Ind		443	0.41		
Eligible voters			202,638	100.00	202,638	100.00
Voted			111,606	55.08	94,924	46.84
Blank or invalid ballots			3,307		1,076	
Total valid votes			108,299		93,848	

== Deputy Mayor ==
The office of the deputy mayor of Verona was officially created in 1994 with the adoption of the new local administration law. The deputy mayor is nominated and eventually dismissed by the mayor. Here is a list of deputy mayors of Verona:

	Deputy	Term start	Term end	Party	Mayor
1	Francesco Girondini	30 June 1994	25 June 1998	LN	Sironi Mariotti
2	Luca Bajona	25 June 1998	12 June 2002	AN	Sironi Mariotti
3	Maurizio Pedrazza Gorlero	1 July 2002	28 May 2007	Ind	Zanotto
4	Alfredo Meocci	16 June 2007	2 July 2008 (Note: Resigned.)	UDC	Tosi
5	Vito Giacino	3 July 2008	12 May 2012	PdL	Tosi
5	Vito Giacino	22 May 2012	15 November 2013 (Note: Resigned.)	PdL	Tosi
6	Stefano Casali	22 November 2013	1 July 2015 (Note: Resigned after being elected regional councillor.)	Ind	Tosi
7	Edoardo Lana	2 July 2015	27 June 2017	Ind	Tosi
8	Lorenzo Fontana	8 July 2017	12 June 2018 (Note: Resigned after being elected member of the Chamber of Deputies.)	Lega	Sboarina
9	Luca Zanotto	13 June 2018	29 June 2022	Lega	Sboarina
10	Barbara Bissoli	18 July 2022	Incumbent	Ind	Tommasi

== See also ==
- Timeline of Verona
