= Aleardo Merlin =

Italian politician (1947–2014)

President of the Province of Verona
- In office 28 June 1999 – 28 June 2004
- Preceded by: Antonio Borghesi
- Succeeded by: Elio Mosele

Mayor of Roverchiara
- In office 27 April 1989 – 28 May 2002

Personal details
- Born: 1 October 1947 Roverchiara, Province of Verona, Italy
- Died: 27 January 2014 (aged 66)
- Party: Christian Democracy; Forza Italia
- Profession: Municipal secretary

Aleardo Merlin (1 October 1947 – 27 January 2014) was an Italian politician who served as president of the Province of Verona from 1999 to 2004 and as mayor of Roverchiara from 1989 to 2002.

== Life and career ==
Merlin was born in Roverchiara in 1947. After graduating in law, he worked as a municipal secretary in several municipalities in the province of Verona. In 1989, he was elected mayor of Roverchiara and was subsequently re-elected, serving until 2002.

In 1994, after the dissolution of the Christian Democracy party, Merlin joined Forza Italia. In the 1999 provincial elections, Merlin was elected president of the Province of Verona, receiving 53% of the vote as the candidate of a centre-right coalition comprising Forza Italia, National Alliance, Christian Democratic Centre, and Veneto Nord Est.

From 2001 to 2007, Merlin served as president of Autostrada Brescia Verona Vicenza Padova. He subsequently served as vice president of Autostrada del Brennero.

Merlin died on 27 January 2014, aged 66, from complications resulting from bronchopneumonia.
