= Nogara =

- Comune
- Comune di Nogara
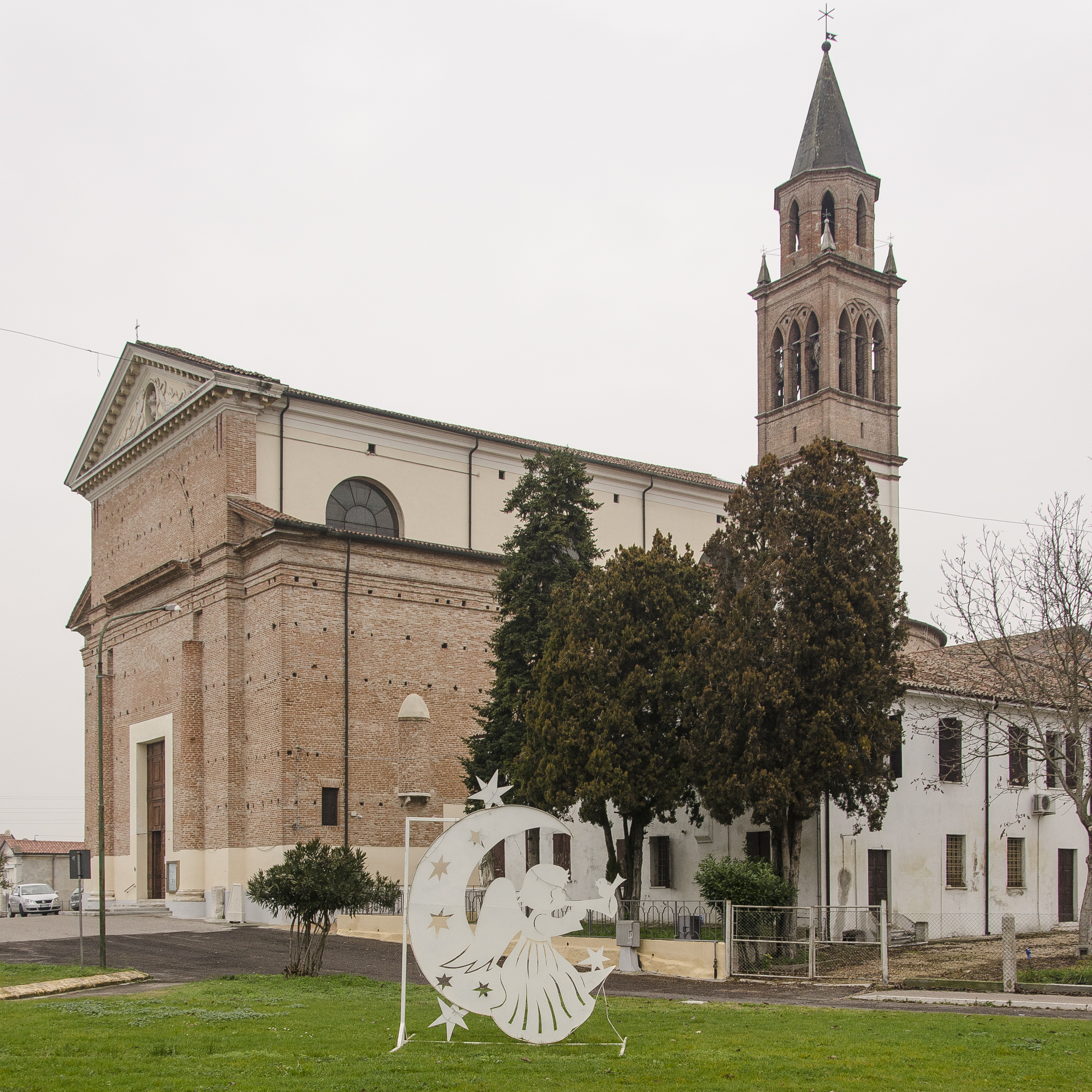
- San Pietro Apostolo church

- Location within Italy Location within Veneto
- Coordinates: 45°11′N 11°4′E
- Country: Italy
- Region: Veneto
- Province: Verona (VR)
- Frazioni: Brancon, Calcinaro, Campalano

Government
  - Mayor: Flavio Pasini

Area
  - Total: 38.9 km^{2} (15.0 sq mi)
- Elevation: 18 m (59 ft)

Population (1 June 2007)
  - Total: 8,365
  - Density: 215/km^{2} (557/sq mi)
- Demonym: Nogaresi
- Time zone: UTC+1 (CET)
  - Summer (DST): UTC+2 (CEST)
- Postal code: 37054, 37050 frazioni
- Dialing code: 0442
- Patron saint: St. Peter
- Saint day: July 16
- Website: Official website

Nogara is a comune (municipality) in the Province of Verona in the Italian region Veneto, located about 100 kilometres (62 mi) southwest of Venice and about 30 kilometres (19 mi) south of Verona.

Nogara borders the following municipalities: Erbè, Gazzo Veronese, Isola della Scala, Salizzole, Sanguinetto, and Sorgà.

== Main sights ==
- Chapel of St. Peter, known from 905.
  This was the pieve from which Nogara gradually grew during the early Middle Ages.
- Church of St. Sylvester (12th century).
- Church of St. Gregory the Great (1533).
- Palazzo Maggi (16th century).
- Villa Marogna (1548)

== Demographic evolution ==
Historical population

Year	Pop.	±%
1861	?	—
1871	4,325	—
1881	4,589	+6.1%
1901	4,856	+5.8%
1911	5,391	+11.0%

Year	Pop.	±%
1921	5,956	+10.5%
1931	6,546	+9.9%
1936	6,577	+0.5%
1951	7,281	+10.7%
1961	6,730	−7.6%

Year	Pop.	±%
1971	6,951	+3.3%
1981	7,470	+7.5%
1991	7,711	+3.2%
2001	7,899	+2.4%

Source: Data from ISTAT
