= Conning (company) =

Global investment management firm

- Type: Private
- Industry: Investment management
- Founded: 1912; 114 years ago
- Headquarters: Hartford, Connecticut, United States
- Key people: Woody Bradford (CEO and Chair)
- Products: Asset management Pension plans
- AUM: ~US$191 billion (2026)
- Number of employees: 350
- Parent: Generali Group; (2024–present)
- Website: www.conning.com

Conning is a global investment management firm serving the insurance industry. Conning supports institutional investors, including pension plans, with investment and asset management products, risk modeling software, and industry research. Founded in 1912, Conning has offices in Boston, Cologne, Hartford, Hong Kong, London, New York and Tokyo.

== History ==
Conning & Company was founded in Hartford, Connecticut in 1912 by William Smith Conning. Conning was born in Slingerlands, New York, just outside of Albany on September 16, 1877, and moved to Hartford in 1904 to serve as office manager for investment firm Hornblower & Weeks.

He founded the firm together with William C. Goeben, a colleague of Conning's at Hornblower & Weeks. The firm embraced the technology of the day, providing election returns to clients by wire from New York during President Woodrow Wilson’s t narrow, re-election victory in 1916 over Charles Evans Hughes.

In 1920, Conning & Company installed a bond ticker and moved into a newly constructed building on Lewis Street in Hartford. In January 1923, Conning Realty Company was incorporated for $50,000 by Conning, Goeben, Mitchell and Charles T. Treadway.

In 1935, a year shy of celebrating its 60th anniversary, the Hartford Stock Exchange closed after failing to comply with the Securities Exchange Act of 1934 and the firm was no longer registered with the exchange. Two of the oldest investment firms in Hartford joined forces when Conning & Company merged with Ballard & Company on December 4, 1942, to become Conning & Company and Ballard.

In late 1948, William S. Conning’s wife, Carolyn Dermott Conning, died. Four months later, the widowed Conning died at the age of 71, leaving behind the couple’s daughter, Katharine S. Conning, who died in 1996.

=== Early activities ===
In 1950, Conning & Company began offering insurance stock research and advice to institutional investors.

After Conning & Company celebrated its 50th anniversary in 1962, the firm continued to emphasize research and education. In 1968, the firm became a Registered Investment Advisor with the SEC.

During 1970, the firm branched out into consulting and strategic industry research for senior insurance executives. By 1974, the firm had 13 Partners and 60 employees operating in Hartford with a subsidiary, Fox-Pitt Kelton Inc., headquartered in London. The subsidiary provided research on U.S. insurance companies and banks to institutional investors throughout Europe.

=== Mergers and acquisitions (1985–1999) ===
In the mid- to late-1980s, the firm formed two new groups: a venture capital unit to raise private equity for insurance investments and an asset management group to manage insurance companies’ assets.

In 1995, Conning Corp. and its subsidiary Conning & Company. were acquired by General American Life Insurance Company (GALIC). Conning Corp.’s asset management business was merged with General American Investment Management Company (GAIMCO) to form Conning Asset Management Company (now known as Conning, Inc.). In 1997, GALIC took Conning Corp. public and completed an initial public offering of 2.875 million shares in 1997. The company began trading on NASDAQ as CNNG.

In August 1998, Conning Asset Management acquired Schroeder Mortgage Associates LP, a small real estate investment company in Manhattan. Four months later, Conning Corp. and Conning Asset Management acquired Noddings Investment Group, a small convertible bond asset manager and broker-dealer located near Chicago.

Conning Corp. also acquired the insurance company and high-grade fixed income management business of TCW Group, based in Los Angeles. In 1999, Forbes ranked Conning Corp. 82nd on its list of 200 Best Small Companies.

=== Expansion (2000–2003) ===
In 2000, MetLife acquired Conning Corp. and took it private, paying $12.50 a share in cash. Later that year, Conning acquired Charter Oak Asset Management of Hartford, and also spun out its MarketStance business in an MBO.

Swiss Reinsurance Company acquired Conning Corp. in July 2001 to build the third-party asset management business. As part of these changes, Conning & Company’s broker-dealer business was shut down and the remnants were combined with Fox-Pitt Kelton Inc.’s similar business; also, its insurance industry research and publications business was transferred to Fox-Pitt Kelton management.

In 2002, Swiss Re Asset Management's Americas’ asset liability management unit came under Conning's control with 20 employees relocating to Hartford. In June, Conning Asset Management Company sold its Mortgage Loan and Real Estate business to Key Corp, and in December, Conning & Company and Conning Asset Management Company sold Noddings to First Albany.

In the first six months of 2003, the company spun out Schroeder Mortgage and Conning Capital Partners in MBOs. Conning US then took over management of SR Asset Management's European third-party asset management businesses in Dublin and London. Although Swiss Re continued to own the entities, they were renamed Conning Asset Management (Europe) Limited located in Dublin and Conning Asset Management Limited located in London.

In 2004, Conning Corp. and Conning, Inc. merged with and into Conning & Company, leaving two entities: Conning & Company and Conning Asset Management Company which then changed its name to Conning, Inc. Also in 2004, Conning & Company acquired Conning Research & Consulting, Inc. a research business from its affiliate Fox-Pitt, Kelton, Inc.

=== New ownership (2009–present) ===
In October 2009, Aquiline Capital Partners acquired Conning & Company from Swiss Reinsurance Company.

In 2010, Conning launched its High-Dividend Equity Fund strategy and acquired the assets of DFA Capital Management, a market leader in economic, capital markets and risk modeling software. The deal included some of DFA's management team, staff, and ADVISE and GEMS software suites.

On September 20, 2011, Conning and Cathay Financial Holdings received regulatory approval for their previously announced joint venture to form a new Hong Kong-headquartered asset management company, now known as Conning Asia Pacific Limited. Later that year, Conning and The Phoenix Companies entered into a multiyear investment agreement under which Conning acquired Goodwin Capital Advisers, Inc. and took management control of the Phoenix's publicly traded fixed income general accounts insurance assets totaling approximately $8 billion.

In June 2014, Conning completed the acquisition of certain assets of Brookfield Investment Management Inc.’s Core Fixed Income Insurance Business. The investment team managing these assets joined Conning in its newly formed midtown Manhattan investment office.

On September 18, 2015, Cathay Financial Holding Co., Ltd. (TWSE: 2882), completed its acquisition of Conning through its subsidiary, Cathay Life Insurance Co, Ltd. This transaction provided complete continuity for Conning and its clients.

On January 31, 2016, Conning acquired Octagon Credit Investors, LLC ("Octagon"), a U.S.-based investment manager with expertise in collateralized loan obligations (CLOs), bank loans and high yield bonds.

In June 2020, Conning Holdings Limited completed the acquisition of a majority interest in the Danish asset management firm Global Evolution.

In July 2023, Italian insurance group Assicurazioni Generali agreed to acquire Conning as part of a partnership with Taiwan's Cathay Financial Holding unit Cathay Life Insurance. On April 3, 2024, it was announced that the acquisition had been completed. In June 2024, Conning CEO Woody Bradford was appointed chief executive officer and general manager of Generali Investments while continuing to serve as Conning's CEO and chairman.

In January 2025, Conning agreed to acquire a 77% stake in MGG Investment Group, a U.S. middle-market direct-lending firm with more than $6 billion in assets under management, for $320 million. The acquisition was completed in October 2025, with MGG's management retaining a minority stake and continuing to operate the firm independently.
