= List of presidents of the Province of Verona =

President of the Province of Verona
- Presidente della Provincia di Verona
- Incumbent; Flavio Pasini since 29 January 2023
- Term length: 4 years
- Inaugural holder: Francesco Campostrini
- Formation: 1889

The president of the Province of Verona is the head of the provincial government in Verona, Veneto, Italy. The president oversees the administration of the province, coordinates the activities of the municipalities, and represents the province in regional and national matters.

Since January 2023, the office has been held by Flavio Pasini of Lega Nord.

== List ==
=== Presidents of the Provincial Deputation (1889–1926) ===
Nº	Portrait	Name	Term of office		Party
Nº	Portrait	Name	Start	End	Party
1		Francesco Campostrini	1889	1893	
2		Luigi Dorigo	1895	1904	
3		Giulio Pontedera	1904	1910	
4		Giovanni Antonio Campostrini	June 1910	August 1914	
(3)		Giulio Pontedera	1914	?	

=== Presidents of the Provincial Rectorate (1926–1945) ===
No.	Portrait	Name	Term of office		Party
No.	Portrait	Name	Start	End	Party
1		Luigi Messedaglia	1929	1933	National Fascist Party
1		Luigi Messedaglia	1933	1934	National Fascist Party

=== Presidents of the Provincial Deputation (1945–1951) ===
No.	Portrait	Name	Term of office		Party
No.	Portrait	Name	Start	End	Party
1		Giuseppe Tommasi	1945	1951	Action Party

=== Presidents of the Province (1951–present) ===
Nº	Portrait	Name	Term of office		Party
Nº	Portrait	Name	Start	End	Party
1		Luigi Buffatti	1951	1956	Christian Democracy
1		Luigi Buffatti	1956	1960	Christian Democracy
2		Renato Gozzi	1961	1965	Christian Democracy
3		Angelo Tomelleri	1965	1970	Christian Democracy
4		Giorgio Zanotto	1970	1975	Christian Democracy
5		Bruno Castelletti	1975	1978	Italian Socialist Party
6		Fabrizio Lonardi	1978	1980	Italian Socialist Party
7		Ennio Molon	1980	30 July 1985	Christian Democracy
8		Massimo De Battisti	30 July 1985	31 July 1990	Italian Socialist Party
9		Alberto Fenzi	31 July 1990	8 May 1995	Italian Socialist Party
10		Antonio Borghesi	8 May 1995	10 November 1998	Liga Veneta–Lega Nord
–		Mario Torda	10 November 1998	28 June 1999	Special commissioner
11		Aleardo Merlin	28 June 1999	28 June 2004	Forza Italia
12		Elio Mosele	28 June 2004	8 June 2009	Independent (centre-right)
13		Giovanni Miozzi	8 June 2009	13 October 2014	The People of Freedom
14		Antonio Pastorello	13 October 2014	31 October 2018	Forza Italia
15		Manuel Scalzotto	31 October 2018	29 January 2023	Liga Veneta–Lega Nord
16		Flavio Pasini	29 January 2023	Incumbent	Liga Veneta–Lega

== Sources ==
- "Storia amministrativa dell'ente". Ministero dell'Interno.
- Agostini, Filiberto (2012). Il governo locale nel Veneto all'indomani della liberazione. Milan: FrancoAngeli.
- Menichini, Piera (2005). "I presidenti delle Province dall'Unità alla Grande guerra: repertorio analitico". Storia Amministrazione Costituzione (13): 299–300.
