= Flavio Pasini =

Italian politician (born 1963)

President of the Province of Verona
- Incumbent
- Assumed office 29 January 2023
- Preceded by: Manuel Scalzotto

Mayor of Nogara
- Incumbent
- Assumed office 6 June 2016
- Preceded by: Luciano Mirandola

Personal details
- Born: Flavio Massimo Pasini; 16 November 1963 (age 62) Nogara, Province of Verona, Italy
- Party: Lega Nord; Lega
- Occupation: Entrepreneur

Flavio Massimo Pasini (born 16 November 1963) is an Italian politician serving as president of the Province of Verona since 2023. A member of Lega, he has served as mayor of Nogara since 2016.

In March 2026, he was appointed national vice president of the Union of Italian Provinces (UPI). The following month, he was elected president of UPI Veneto.
