= Assicurazioni Generali =

Italian insurance company

Assicurazioni Generali S.p.A.

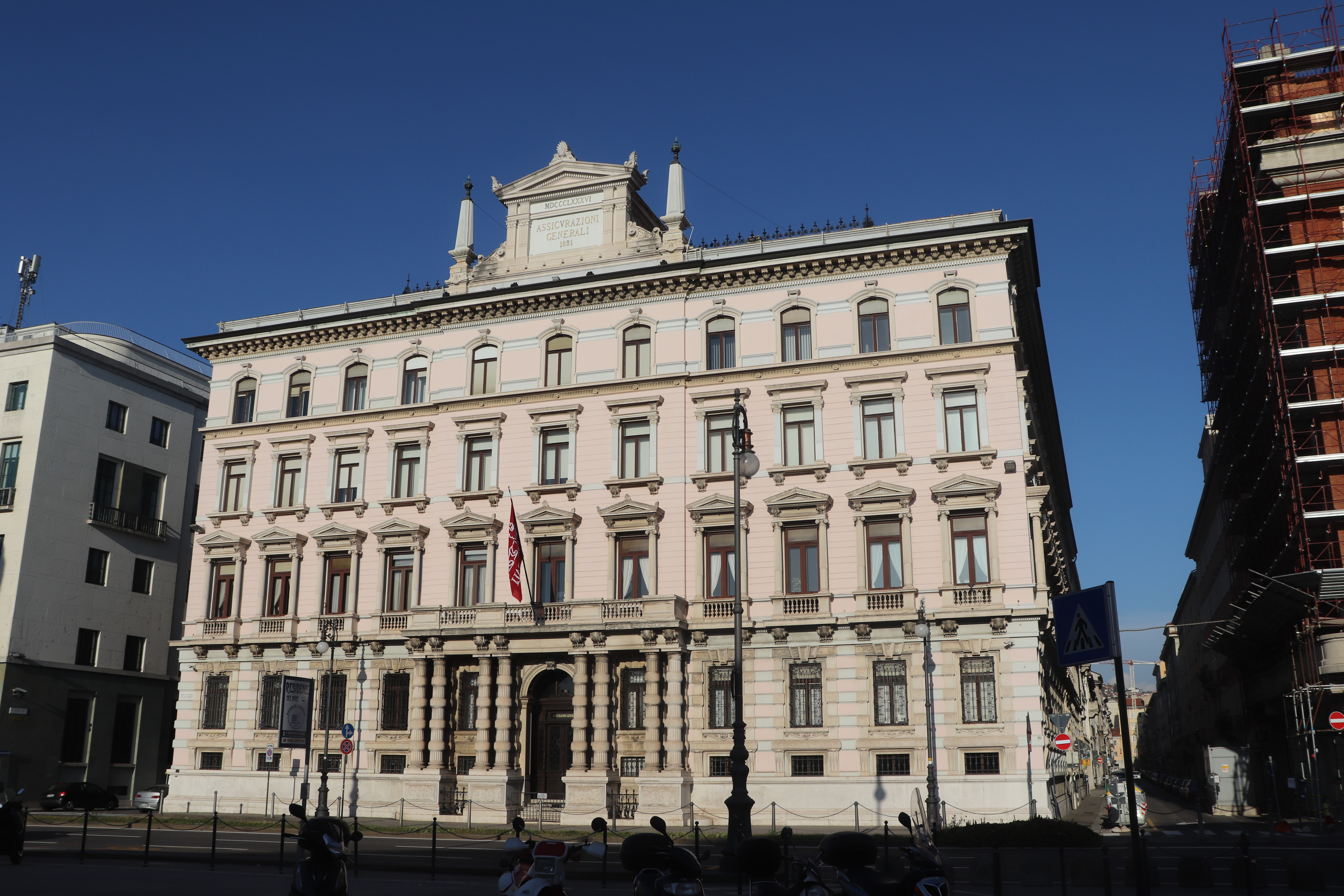
- Assicurazioni Generali headquarters in Trieste
- Type: Public
- Traded as: BIT: G FTSE MIB Component
- Industry: Financial services
- Founded: 1831; 195 years ago
- Headquarters: Trieste, Italy
- Area served: Worldwide
- Key people: Andrea Sironi (chairman); Philippe Donnet (CEO); Giulio Terzariol (Group Deputy CEO)
- Products: Banking; Insurance; General insurance; Health insurance; Vehicle insurance; Travel insurance; Home insurance; Life insurance; Mortgage loans; Investment management; Asset management; Mutual funds
- Revenue: ▲€98.1 billion (2023)
- Operating income: ▲€8.0 billion (2025)
- Net income: ▲€4.3 billion (2025)
- AUM: ▲€904.8 billion (Q1 2026)
- Total assets: 710,000,000,000 euro (2022)
- Number of employees: 88,000 (2025)
- Website: www.generali.com

Assicurazioni Generali S.p.A. (/ˌdʒɛnəˈrɑːli/ JEN-ər-AH-lee, Italian: [assikuratˈtsjoːni dʒeneˈraːli]; meaning 'general insurances') or commonly known as Generali Group is an Italian insurance company based in Trieste. As of 2022, it is the largest insurance company in Italy and ranks among the world's largest insurance companies by net premiums and assets.

Generali's major competitors at the international level are AXA, Allianz and Zurich Insurance Group. The company is listed on the Borsa Italiana and is part of the FTSE MIB index of the same stock exchange.

== History ==
Established on December 26, 1831, as the Imperial Regia Privilegiata Compagnia di Assicurazioni Generali Austro-Italiche ('Imperial and Royal Privileged Company for Austrian-Italian General Insurances') in Trieste. Its promoter was Giuseppe Lazzaro Morpurgo.

The adjective "Generali" ("general") referred to the company's comprehensive insurance coverage across all the branches (fire, life, hail, sea, land and river transport). This approach was rare at the time when most Trieste insurance companies focused solely on maritime transport, except for the Azienda Assicuratrice, which also dealt with hail insurance.

The "Austrian-Italian" label referred to the company's dual management structure, with the main office in Trieste responsible for the company's affairs and relations with the Habsburg Monarchy, (at the time, Trieste was the most important seaport of the Austrian Empire). Meanwhile, a management office in Venice oversaw activities in Lombardy-Venetia and the Italian peninsula.

Financed with a share capital of two million florins, Generali attracted a diverse group of shareholders from Trieste and Lombardy-Venetia, including influential figures like Giovanni Cristoforo Ritter de Záhony, Giovanni Battista de Rosmini, Marco Parente, Samuele Della Vida, and Pasquale Revoltella.

The Habsburg eagle symbol, a nod to Trieste's Austrian possession since 1382 until 1918, was chosen as the company's emblem. During the 1860s, as the Risorgimento ended Austrian domination of Italy, this logo was replaced with one based on the Venetian Lion of Saint Mark.

Generali's early presence in multiple markets stemmed from the historically commercial nature of both Trieste and Venice. In its first decade, the company's agency network expanded across all Italian states, major cities of the empire, and leading European ports.

Until 1847, Gianbattista de Rosmini, the legal adviser and a significant shareholder, played a pivotal role, serving as the permanent president of the General Congresses and effectively leading the company. Following the uprisings of the Risorgimento in 1848, the "Austrian-Italian" adjective was dropped, and the company became only Assicurazioni Generali.

By 1856, Generali had grown to become the largest insurance company in the Austrian Empire, culminating in its listing on the Trieste Stock Exchange the following year.

Following Italy's unification, Generali's Venetian management led the company to become the largest insurance company in the newly formed kingdom, with Samuele Della Vida overseeing the Italian branch until 1875.

The symbol of Assicurazioni Generali is derived from the flag of the Republic of Venice, dissolved by Napoleon three decades before the company was founded.

In 1869, Generali foresaw the significant impact of the Suez Canal's inauguration on world trade. Key figures within the company, including Pasquale Revoltella and Giuseppe Morpurgo, were involved in the historic event, with Revoltella becoming the vice president of the Universal Company of the Suez Canal.

The opening of the canal brought about a favorable economic climate for Generali, leading to its expansion across various regions, from the eastern Mediterranean to North Africa, the Far East, and the Americas.

Under the stewardship of Marco Besso, who managed the company from 1877 to 1920 and eventually became its president, Generali assumed an international dimension. The company opened agencies in the Mediterranean, St. Petersburg, Warsaw, the Americas, and the Far East, while also founding subsidiaries such as Erste Allgemeine Schaden und Unfallversicherung in Vienna, Generala in Romania, Anonima Grandine, and Anonima Infortuni in Italy.

During this period, Generali's most prestigious Italian offices were constructed, including notable buildings in Florence, Trieste, Milan, Rome, and Turin. In 1914, the Procuratie Vecchie, the seat of the Venice administration, underwent restructuring. Amidst the challenges of the First World War, which pitted Italy against Austria-Hungary, Generali's Venetian and Trieste headquarters maintained their operational independence, allowing the company to navigate complex circumstances without taking political positions that could compromise its integrity.

=== The Italian period ===
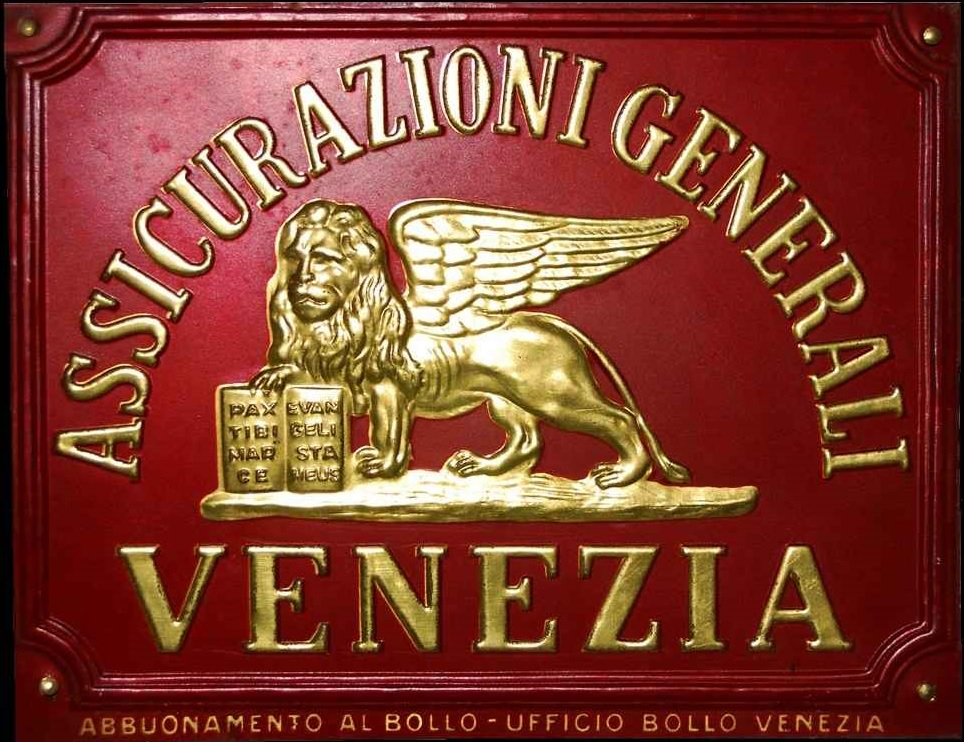
Original metal plaque with raised gilt signature and Lion of Saint Mark, 1924–1940

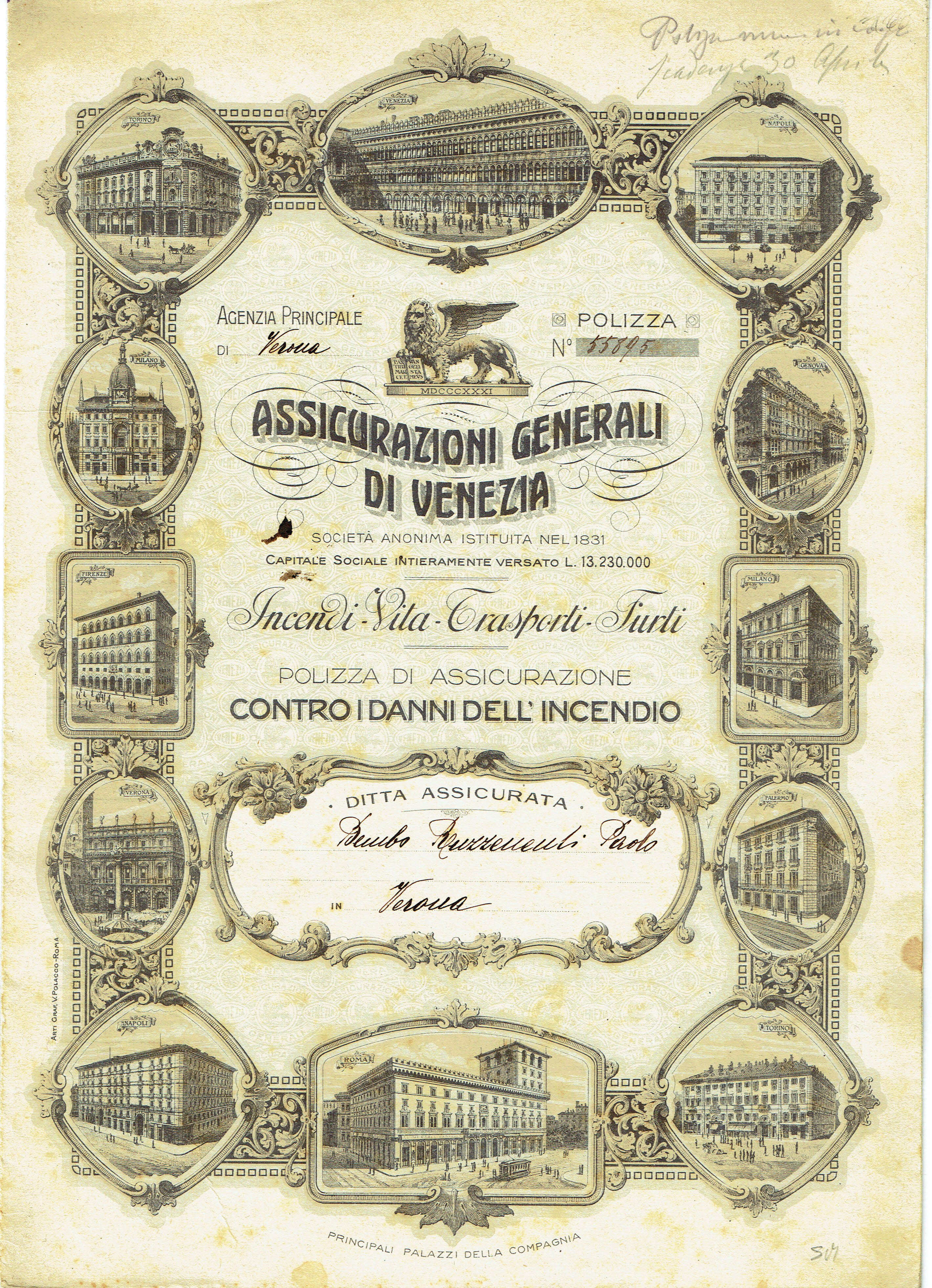
Insurance policy of the Assicurazioni Generali, issued 1919

In 1920, Edgardo Morpurgo assumed the role of president, ushering in a phase of further international expansion for the company. By 1924, due in part to the division of the Austro-Hungarian Empire, Generali had established eight overseas management offices and had a presence in sixty branches and agencies across thirty countries. By 1935, it had expanded to include twenty-nine subsidiaries in Europe, four in the Americas, two in Africa, and one in Asia. During this time, the company's image was managed by Marcello Dudovich, contributing to its growing reputation. Alleanza Assicurazioni was acquired during this period.

However, the mid-1930s brought challenges, as the rise of racial laws and the tightening relationship with Fascism created a difficult environment. In the first century of activity, Assicurazioni Generali had consolidated and expanded also thanks to the decisive presence of shareholders and managers of Jewish origin, from the Morpurgos to the Maurogonatos, from the Levi Della Vidas to the Treves de' Bonfilis.

In 1938, as the impending "racial laws" loomed and Benito Mussolini visited Trieste, a Morpurgo, who was serving as president at the time, was asked to resign, handing over the presidency to Giuseppe Volpi di Misurata. During this era, Generali was under the guidance of managing director Gino Baroncini.

The company faced significant challenges during World War II, including German and Yugoslav occupations and the subsequent British-American administration of the Free Territory of Trieste. Following this tumultuous period, Generali's branches in Eastern countries were expropriated under the presidencies of Antonio Cosulich (1943–1948) and Mario Abbiate (1948–1954), adding to the complexities. Between 1960 and 1968, Baroncini, who had been with Generali since 1937, served as president during Italy's economic boom.

In 1963 the French branch of Generali, Concorde, adopting the intuition of Pierre Desnos, founded Europ Assistance; the new company gave birth to the concept of "private assistance", offering organized support to individuals facing difficult situations away from home.

In 1974, the company established Genagricola, which focused on the Group's agricultural activities.

From 1968 to 1979 Cesare Merzagora was president and restructured the company in a more efficient and transparent way. He was succeeded by Enrico Randone, who held the position until 1990.

In 1988, Generali bolstered its presence in France by acquiring a stake in Compagnie du Midi. The following year, it became a shareholder in the AXA Midi group. In 1996, Generali made a strategic decision to sell its share package, providing the necessary liquidity for the purchase of INA Assitalia.

In 1994, Generali launched Genertel, the first company in Italy to offer financial services via telephone. Four years later, in 1998, Banca Generali was established as an online bank. Over time, Banca Generali evolved into a banking hub within the Group, moving into the private banking segment.

=== Recent years ===
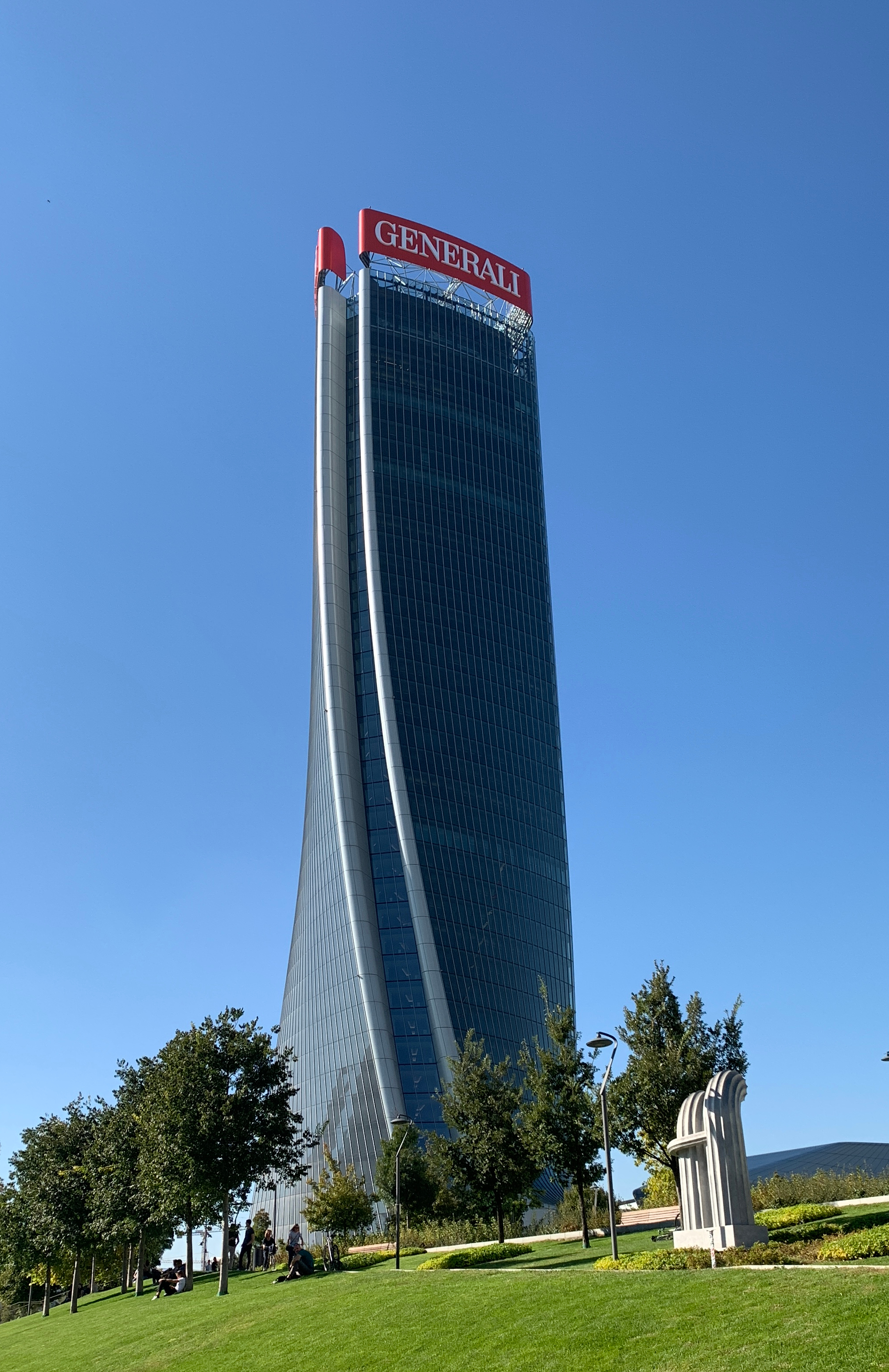
Generali Tower in Milan

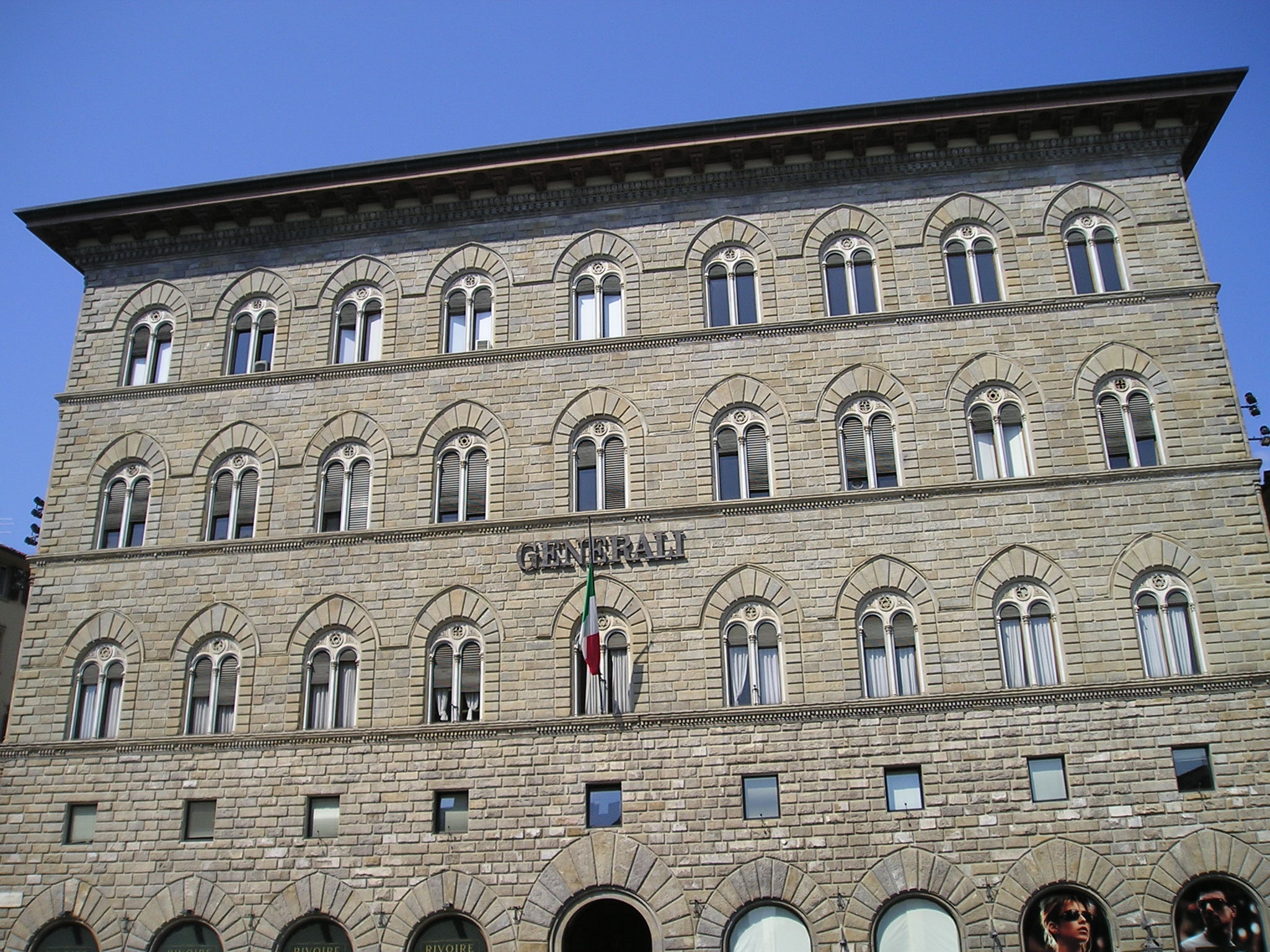
Palazzo delle Assicurazioni Generali in Florence, Italy

Following the acquisition of INA Assitalia in 2000, Generali acquired Toro Assicurazioni in 2006. As the company expanded, it established Generali Real Estate in 2011 to manage its real estate activities. Generali Real Estate soon became a prominent player in the sector, becoming the sole owner of CityLife, the new residential and commercial complex that stands on the area of the old Milan fair at Portello. Among the notable structures within CityLife is the Generali Tower, designed by archistar Zaha Hadid, which has served as the Group's headquarters in Milan since 2019.

In 2013, a significant corporate restructuring took place when the Italian branch of Assicurazioni Generali was incorporated into INA Assitalia, leading to the formation of Generali Italia. The new entity, effective from July 1, 2013, encompassed Toro Assicurazioni, Lloyd Italico, and Augusta Assicurazioni, with Philippe Donnet assuming the role of managing director and Country Manager in Italy. Donnet became CEO of the Generali Group in March 2016. In 2018, local insurance company ASSA bought Generali's business in Panama.

In 2022, the general shareholders' meeting reappointed Donnet for a third term, During the same meeting, Andrea Sironi, an academic and president of Bocconi University, was elected president of the Group.

The company continued its expansion efforts in June 2023, announcing the acquisition of Liberty Seguros, a competitor operating in Spain and Portugal's non-life insurance sector, from the US group Liberty Mutual. As a result, Generali will rise to become the fourth non-life insurance company in Spain, the second in the Portuguese market and will enter the top ten in the sector in Ireland and Northern Ireland.

On July 6, 2023, Generali acquired Conning and its subsidiaries. Additionally, the company entered into a ten-year partnership with Cathay Life, making the latter a minority shareholder (holding 16.75% of shares) in Generali Investment Holding, an entity that houses the majority of Generali's asset management activities. This acquisition bolstered Generali's total assets under management, which then amounted to 775 billion euros, an increase of 144 billion euros. Consequently, Generali claimed its position as the ninth European player in terms of assets under management. In June 2024, Generali appointed Woody Bradford, then chief executive officer and chairman of Conning Holdings Limited, as chief executive officer and general manager of Generali Investments Holding. Bradford retained his positions at Conning.

On 21 January 2025, Generali and BPCE announced that they have signed a non-binding memorandum of understanding to create a 50-50 owned joint venture in order combine their asset management operations. As Natixis Investment Managers (BPCE's asset management arm, which includes Ostrum Asset Management) has around €1.2tn in assets under management and as Generali has €630bn of assets under management, the deal would create one of the largest asset management firm in Europe, with around €1.9tn of assets under management. On 11 December 2025, Generali and BPCE announced the termination of the negotiations aiming at the creation of a joint venture between their asset management operations.

== Operations ==
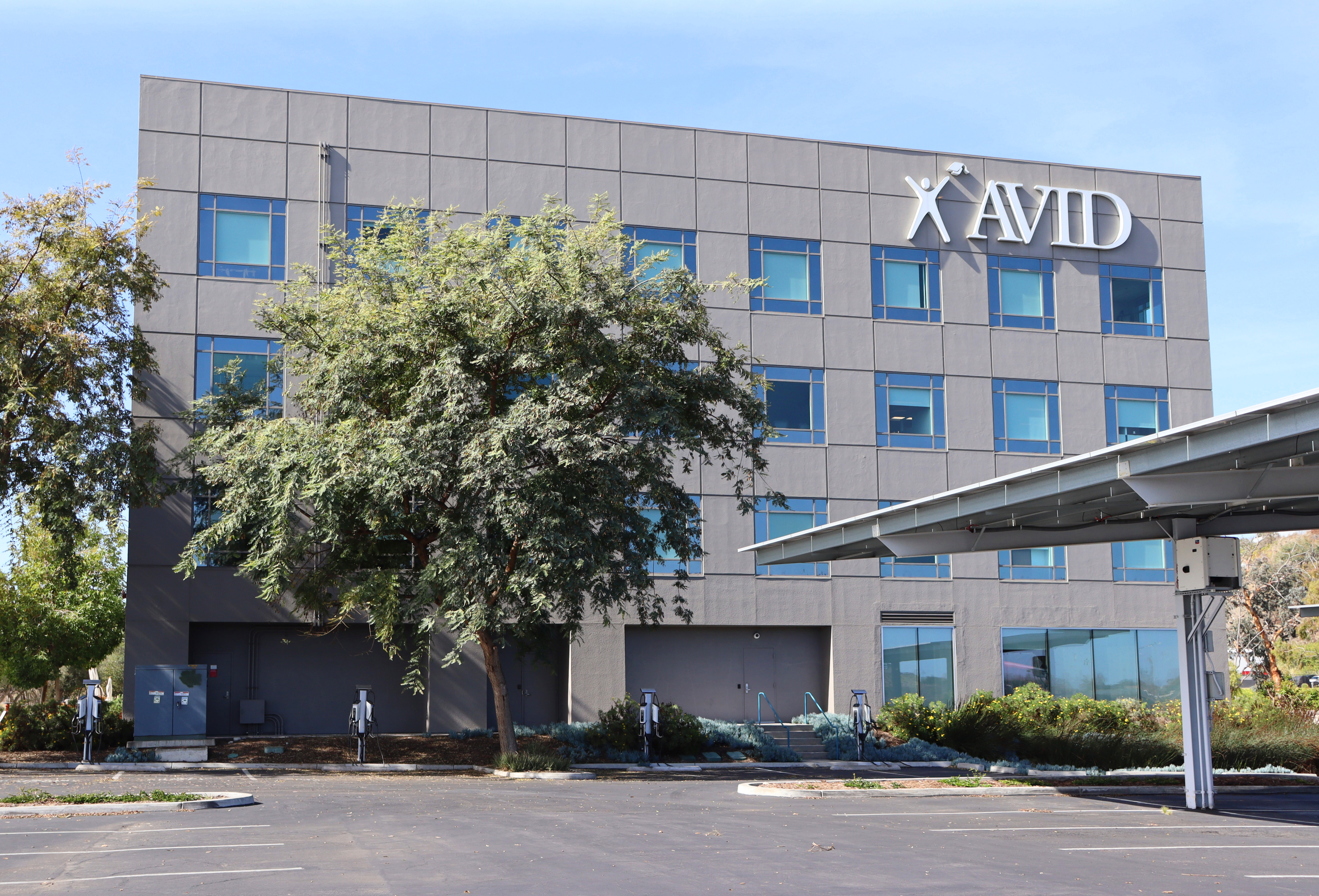
Generali Global Assistance's office at AVID Center in San Diego

Generali operates in 50 countries through a network of over 400 companies.

The company's current organizational structure comprises five distinct Business Units:

- Italy
- Germany, Austria and Switzerland
- France & Global Business Activities
- International
- Asset & Wealth Management

The company's business model revolves around three core pillars:

- Life insurance
- Property & Casualty insurance
- Asset Management

=== Bank ownership ===
Banca Generali is a subsidiary of Assicurazioni Generali, of which it owns 50.17%.

== Shareholder structure ==
As of 7 October 2026, Assicurazioni Generali's shareholders were:

- 13.35% Banca Monte dei Paschi di Siena (through Mediobanca)
- 10.15% Delfin S.à.r.l
- 9.05% UniCredit
- 6.32% Caltagirone SpA (Francesco Gaetano Caltagirone)
- 4.91% Benetton Group (through Edizione holding)
- 3.13% Intesa Sanpaolo

Based on the share capital, 71.90% of Assicurazioni Generali is owned by Italian investors.

== Notable employees ==
- Franz Kafka worked for nearly nine months (between November 1, 1907, and July 15, 1908) at the Assicurazioni Generali office in Prague.

== The Human Safety Net ==
The Human Safety Net is the foundation established by Generali in 2017 with the mission to support disadvantaged individuals and communities. The foundation focuses on assisting people living in vulnerable conditions, providing them with opportunities for growth and progress.

To fulfill its mission, The Human Safety Net collaborates with approximately 60 entities, including non-governmental organizations (NGOs) and social enterprises. Through these partnerships, the foundation implements various programs aimed at two primary target groups: families and refugees. The Human Safety Net is based at the Procuratie Vecchie, Generali's historic headquarters in Venice.

== Sponsorship ==
Generali demonstrates a strong commitment to sports sponsorship and sustainability, engaging in various initiatives that promote and support sports activities. In 2010, Generali launched the Responsible Sports Charter, aimed at actively fostering a culture of sustainability in sports. Furthermore, Generali sponsors two football stadiums, the Stadion Letná in Prague and the Franz Horr Stadium in Vienna.

For over four decades, Generali has been a sponsor of Barcolana, a historic international sailing regatta held annually in the Gulf of Trieste.

Additionally, Generali is a sponsor of two road races, the Generali Berlin Half Marathon in Berlin and the Generali München Marathon in Munich.

Generali also supports culture and in France, since 1995, it has been committed to promoting and reviving Italian art and culture. The first commitment was to support the restoration of Giambattista Tiepolo's "Henry III Received at the Villa Contarini", a fresco depicting the arrival of King Henry III in Venice, exhibited at the Jacquemart-André Museum.

== Controversy ==
Although Generali is involved in indemnifying the policies of Holocaust victims (having created in 1997 a “Policy Information Center” in Trieste, funded the independent trust “The Generali Fund in Memory of the Generali Insured in East and Central Europe Who Perished in the Holocaust”, ceased in 2008, and being a founding member of the International Commission on Holocaust Era Insurance Claims), a lawsuit aiming to collect claims on life insurance policies sold to victims of the Holocaust was started. In 2007 Generali decided to voluntarily enter into a class action settlement approved by the US Court of Appeals for the Second Circuit, after the lower court had already dismissed all of the cases and claims against it.

The Law & Order episode "Blood Money" is based on Generali subsidiaries selling life insurance to poor Jews in WWII Europe and then not paying out in case of death. In the episode, the motive for a retired insurance salesman's murder appears to be a series of policies he sold to Jews in Poland during the Holocaust.

== See also ==
- Palazzo delle Assicurazioni Generali (Milan)
- Generali Building
- Generali Italia
