= Alleanza Assicurazioni =

Italian insurance company

Alleanza Assicurazioni S.p.A.
- Type: Subsidiary
- Industry: Financial services
- Founded: 1898; 128 years ago
- Founders: Evan George Mackenzie; Giacomo Castalbolognesi; Enrico Rava; Giuseppe Corradi
- Headquarters: Milan, Italy
- Key people: Davide Passero (CEO and General Manager); Andrea Mencattini (chair)
- Products: Insurance
- Parent: Generali Italia
- Website: alleanza.it

Alleanza Assicurazioni S.p.A. is an Italian insurance company based in Milan. It was founded in Genoa in 1898. The company is particularly active in the life insurance sector. Since 1934 it has been part of the Generali Group and it has been part of Generali Italia since 2013.

== History ==
In the 1870s Evan George Mackenzie had opened an insurance agency in Genoa which represented some important French, British and Austrian companies. The agency was enormously successful: eighty employees worked there and it was the largest insurance agency in Italy.
On 12 October 1898, Mackenzie together with Giacomo Castelbolognesi, Enrico Rava and Giuseppe Corradi founded Alleanza Assicurazioni. The company has a nominal capital of fifteen million and the paid-up capital of one and a half million lire, and operates in all insurance fields. It is the second most important insurance company in Genoa, the city from which it inherits its symbol: St. George killing the dragon.
In the first decade of the twentieth century, Alleanza already had 345 agencies, almost all in Italy, but some also in Greece, Turkey, Tunisia, Tripolitania, Malta and Spain.
From the beginning the life branch had represented the main area of the company but in 1912 the Giolitti government with law 305 proceeded to the nationalization of life insurance and, like all companies active in the sector, Alleanza Assicurazioni was also forced to sell the branch life to INA. This represented a serious damage to the company.
The decree of 29 April 1923 reintroduced competition for life insurance and in 1924 Mackenzie decided to reorganize the company, which would operate exclusively in the life sector. In this new framework, the general management was transferred to Milan. The restructuring gave excellent results: thirty-three agencies were reopened and premium income increased by 36%.

Alleanza was controlled with a stake of around 50.4% by Assicurazioni Generali between 1933 and June 2009, when Generali announced plans to acquire the remainder of its shares. In February 2009, the merger by incorporation of Alleanza into Generali together with Toro Assicurazioni began with the consequent transfer of the insurance activities of Alleanza and Toro to a new company wholly owned by Generali and called Alleanza Toro S.p.A. The merger was completed on 1 October.
With effect from 31 December 2013, Alleanza Assicurazioni became a separate brand from Toro Assicurazioni and resumed its role in the life business, maintaining the non-life business acquired and strengthened by the previous merger with Toro.
Leading Alleanza since 6 October 2014 is Davide Passero, previously CEO of Genertel and Genertellife, while the president is Andrea Mencattini. Under the management of Passero, Alleanza completed the digitization of the distribution network in 2017 and achieved marked growth in financial results (9%).

In May 2024, the merger by incorporation of Genertellife into Alleanza Assicurazioni was announced; the operation was finalized on January 1, 2025.

== Activities ==
Alleanza, as of December 31, 2025, has:

- 1.9 million customers
- 10,000 insurance advisors
- 11.5 billion in total premiums
- 79 billion assets under management
