= Andrea Sironi =

Italian economist

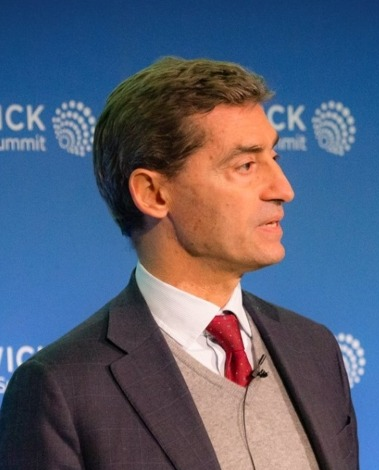
- Born: 13 May 1964 (age 62); Milan, Italy
- Education: Bocconi University
- Occupations: Academic, businessman
- Employer: Bocconi University
- Known for: chairman of Borsa Italiana

Andrea Sironi (born 13 May 1964) is an Italian academic. He is a Professor of Banking and Finance at Bocconi University, where he was the Rector from 2012 to 2016, and has been the President since 2022. He also serves as chairman of Assicurazioni Generali and Fondazione AIRC per la Ricerca sul Cancro.

== Early life ==
Andrea Sironi was born on 13 May 1964 in Milan, Italy. He graduated from Bocconi University with a degree in economics. After graduating he moved to London where he worked as a financial analyst at The Chase Manhattan Bank, now JP Morgan Chase.

== Career ==
In 1990 he returned to Italy and began teaching at Bocconi, where he is currently Full Professor of Banking and Finance. In 1993, he was a visiting scholar at the Department of Finance of the Stern School of Business at New York University for one semester.

He was a visiting scholar at the Federal Reserve in Washington, D.C. in 2000; in the same year he became director of the Claudio Dematté Research Division of SDA Bocconi, a role he would hold until 2006. In 2004 he has been Dean of the Graduate School for one year.

From 2005 to November 2008, Sironi held the position of Dean for Internationalization in Bocconi University, where he also served as Rector from 2012 to 2016, when he was succeeded by Gianmario Verona. During this time, he encouraged faculty to publish research in English rather than Italian, and he promoted social mobility by waiving tuition for underprivileged students. Sironi also served as the chairman of the Global Alliance in Management Education from 2014 to 2016.

In 2017 he was appointed as a member of the group of experts that assessed the value of the capital shares of the Bank of Italy. In 2018 he was visiting professor at the economics department of Sciences Po in Paris. As an academic, Sironi carries out research on financial risk management, regulation and international supervision of financial institutions. Since 1 November 2022 he has been president of Bocconi University.

== Other activities ==
Andrea Sironi has been a member of the board of directors of Intesa San Paolo (2020–2022), UniCredit (2018- 2019), Cassa Depositi e Prestiti (2016–2018), Banco Popolare (2008–2013), SAES Getters (2006–2015) and other national and international financial institutions.

From 2013 to 2016 he was a member of the strategic committee of the Fondo Strategico Italiano. On 29 October 2015 he was appointed Chairman of the Italian Stock Exchange (Borsa Italiana), a role he would cover from 2016 until 2022.

On 1 October 2016 he joined the board of directors of the London Stock Exchange Group, resigning on 20 November 2020, following the sale of Borsa Italiana S.p.a. by the London Stock Exchange Group. Since 2015 he has been a member of the International Advisory Council of the Stockholm School of Economics.

From 2017 to 2022 he was a member of the board of directors of EASL International Liver Foundation in Geneva. He was also a member of the advisory board of the Nova School of Business and Economics in Lisbon.

Since May 2021 he has been Chairman of Fondazione AIRC per la Ricerca sul Cancro. He is a member of the board of directors of ISPI (since 2016) and of the advisory board of Cometa. Since 2 May 2022, Andrea Sironi has been Chairman of Assicurazioni Generali.

Since April 2023 he has been a member of the board of directors of the Agnelli Foundation.

== Personal life ==
Sironi is passionate about sailing (he crossed the Atlantic Ocean twice) and swimming (in 2018 he won two bronze medals at the World Transplant Games). He is married, and he has three children.

== Works ==
=== Papers ===
- "Reforming the Italian Financial System: Recent Evolution and Future Prospects". Occasional Paper. New York University Salomon Center. 1994.
- Sironi, Andrea (2001-03-01). "An Analysis of European Banks Snd Issues and its Implications for the Design of a Mandatory Subordinated Debt Policy". Social Science Research Network (ID 249285). doi:10.2139/ssrn.249285. S2CID 154427810. SSRN 249285.
- Sironi, Andrea (2002-05-01). "Strengthening banks' market discipline and leveling the playing field: Are the two compatible?". Journal of Banking & Finance. 26 (5): 1065–1091. doi:10.1016/S0378-4266(02)00212-1.
- Sironi, Andrea; Zazzara, Cristiano (2003-01-01). "The Basel Committee proposals for a new capital accord: implications for Italian banks". Review of Financial Economics. 12 (1): 99–126. doi:10.1016/S1058-3300(03)00009-0.
- Sironi, Andrea (2001-01-11). "Testing for Market Discipline in the European Banking Industry: Evidence from Subordinated Debt Issues". Social Science Research Network (ID 249284). doi:10.2139/ssrn.249284. S2CID 18981400. SSRN 249284.
- Sironi, Andrea; Zazzara, Cristiano (2004-10-01). "Applying credit risk models to deposit insurance pricing: Empirical evidence from the Italian banking system". Journal of International Banking Regulations. 6 (1): 10–32. doi:10.1057/palgrave.jbr.2340179. S2CID 154454553.
- Altman, Edward; Resti, Andrea; Sironi, Andrea (2004-07-01). "Default Recovery Rates in Credit Risk Modelling: A Review of the Literature and Empirical Evidence". Economic Notes. 33 (2): 183–208. doi:10.1111/j.0391-5026.2004.00129.x. S2CID 8312724.
- Gabbi, Giampaolo; Sironi, Andrea (2005-02-01). "Which factors affect corporate bonds pricing? Empirical evidence from eurobonds primary market spreads". The European Journal of Finance. 11 (1): 59–74. doi:10.1080/1351847032000143422. S2CID 153360699.
- Edward Altman; Andrea Resti; Andrea Sironi (2005). "Default and Recovery Rates in Credit Risk Modelling: A Review of the Literature and Empirical Evidence". Journal of Finance Literature.
- Edward Altman; Brooks Brady; Andrea Resti; Andrea Sironi (2005). "The Link between Default and Recovery Rates: Theory, Empirical Evidence, and Implications". The Journal of Business. 78 (6): 2203–2228. doi:10.1086/497044. JSTOR 10.1086/497044. S2CID 1018631.
- Resti, Andrea; Sironi, Andrea (2007-01-01). "The risk-weights in the New Basel Capital Accord: Lessons from bond spreads based on a simple structural model". Journal of Financial Intermediation. 16 (1): 64–90. doi:10.1016/j.jfi.2006.04.002.
- Iannotta, Giuliano; Nocera, Giacomo; Sironi, Andrea (2007-07-01). "Ownership structure, risk and performance in the European banking industry". Journal of Banking & Finance. 31 (7): 2127–2149. doi:10.1016/j.jbankfin.2006.07.013. S2CID 3657103.
- Resti, Andrea; Sironi, Andrea (2007-01-07). "What's Different about Loans? An Analysis of the Risk Structure of Credit Spreads". Social Science Research Network (ID 1265085). doi:10.2139/ssrn.1265085. S2CID 33981525. SSRN 1265085.
- Iannotta, Giuliano; Nocera, Giacomo; Sironi, Andrea (2013-04-01). "The impact of government ownership on bank risk". Journal of Financial Intermediation. 22 (2): 152–176. doi:10.1016/j.jfi.2012.11.002. S2CID 154961894.
- Sironi, Andrea (2018-11-01). "The Evolution of Banking Regulation Since the Financial Crisis: A Critical Assessment". Social Science Research Network (ID 3304672). doi:10.2139/ssrn.3304672. S2CID 199331188. SSRN 3304672.

== Books ==
- with Vincenzo Capizzi, Antonio Salvi, The cost of capital and international competitiveness of italian companies, EGEA, 2003
- with Edward Altman, Andrea Resti, Recovery Risk: the next challenge in credit risk management, Risk Books, London, 2005
- with Andrea Resti, Risk management and shareholders' value in banking: from risk measurement models to capital allocation policies, Wiley and Sons, London, 2007, ISBN 978-04-700-2978-7
