= University of Verona =

Italian university

- Type: Public
- Established: 1982
- Rector: Prof. Chiara Leardini
- Location: Verona, Veneto, Italy; 45°26′12″N 11°0′13″E
- Campus: Both Urban and suburban
- Website: www.univr.it/en

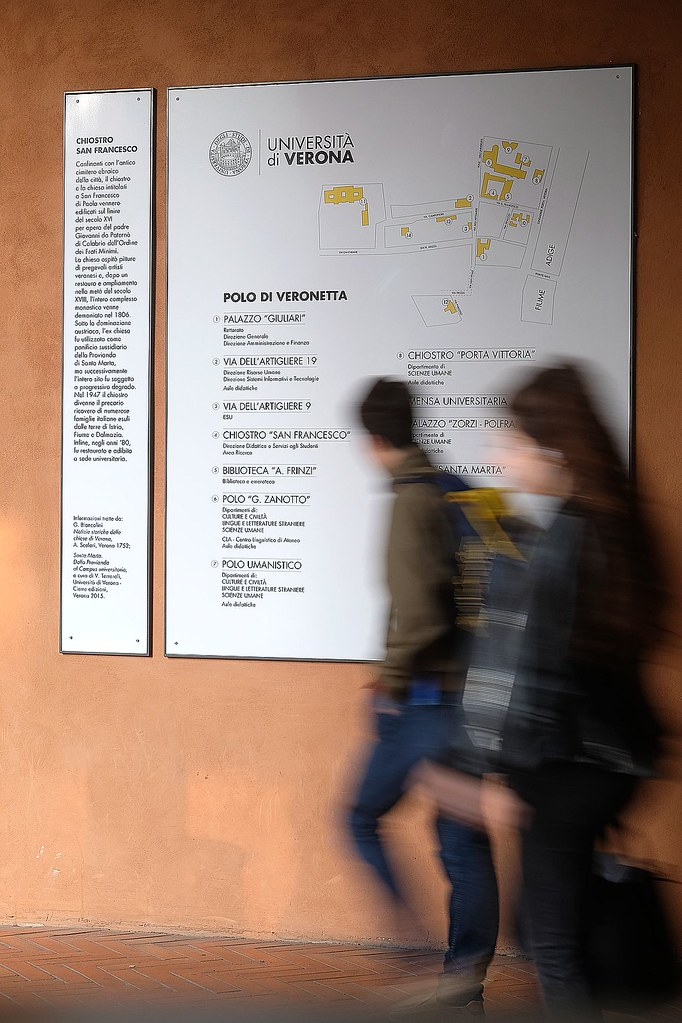
University of Verona - map

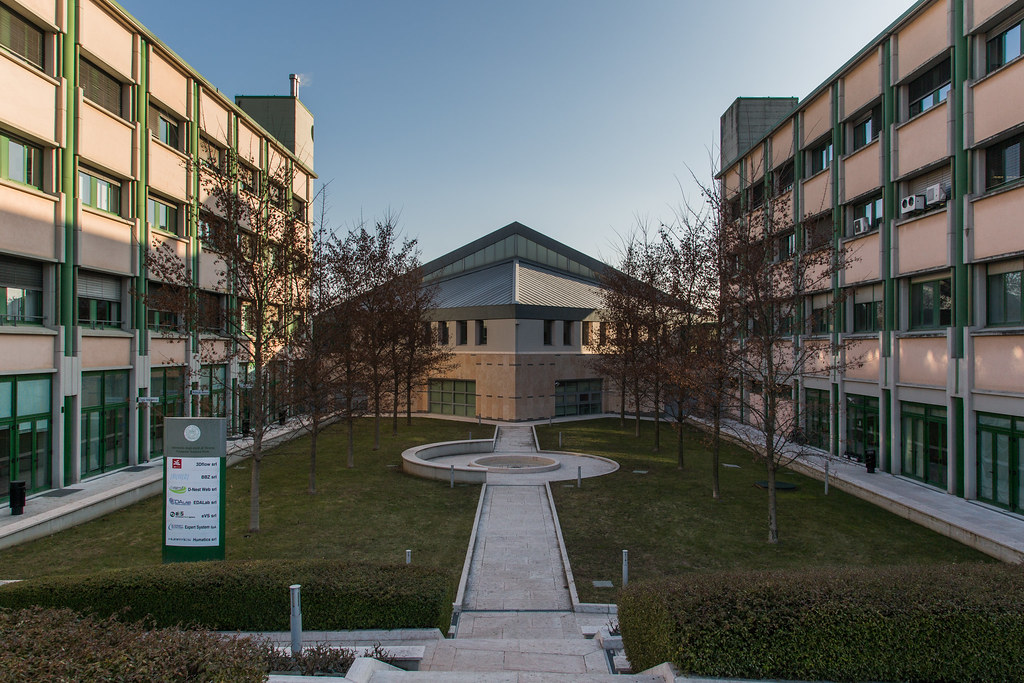
Ca' Vignal

The University of Verona (Italian: Università degli Studi di Verona) is a university located in Verona, Italy. It was founded in 1982 and is organized in 13 Departments. The Italian business newspaper Il Sole 24 Ore ranked it as the best non-private university in Italy in 2014, 2015 and 2016.

== History ==
In Verona, at the beginning of the 1950s, a group of Catholic intellectuals established the "Ludovico Antonio Muratori" Free High School of Historical Science, together with the magazine Nova Historia.

It was from this group of scholars that the idea of building a university in Verona was created. The idea took shape in February 1959 when the then-mayor, Prof. Giorgio Zanotto, placed as the order of the day during a session of the Municipal Council "the institution in Verona of a University Faculty of Economics and Commerce".

The Provincial Administration and Chamber of Commerce were in ready agreement. Thus they created the Free Faculty of Economics and Commerce and the Consortium for university studies to manage it. In the summer of 1959 the project began, the location in Palazzo Giuliari was decided, donated by Countess Giuliari Tusini and which is now home to the Chancellor's office. Enrolments began and on 1 November of the same year, the inauguration ceremony of the new Faculty was held.

But the lack of government recognition hindered everyone's expectations, both of the Veronese public bodies and the students themselves. The city authorities immediately joined together to find a solution and in 1963 Padua University recognised the Faculty of Economics and Commerce as part of its own Faculty with a branch in Verona. In July 1963 the first thesis of the first graduate of the new Veronese faculty was examined.

Shortly after Padua decided to transfer the Medical and Surgical and Legal sections to Verona, which has now become Arts and Philosophy.

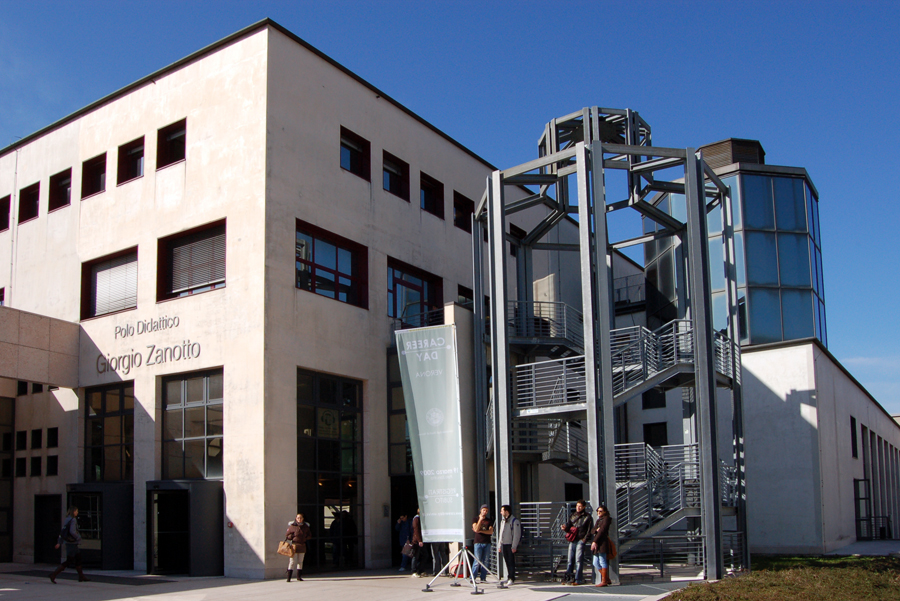
Exterior of the University

The project that gave rise to the history of Verona University was finally and definitively achieved in 1982, when the governmental authorities gave Verona the autonomy and status of its university.

Thanks to the support and strict collaboration of the main public and private governmental institutional representatives, both regional and local, and thanks to the support of its teachers, Verona University has grown over the years to have the fifteen departments it has today. Under the encouragement of recent reforms on didactics, Verona University now proposes numerous, innovative degree courses to offer students a wide and specific range of study choices. From a location point of view, Verona University has two important poles: Veronetta, where the humanistic departments are to be found and Borgo Roma, the site of the Medicine and Science departments, besides the many other locations spread throughout the territory: Legnago (VR), Vicenza, Bolzano, Trento and Rovereto.

The European Parliament at its plenary session in Strasbourg on 13 July 1995 passed a resolution condemning practices in Verona University, text at pp.53-54. https://www.europarl.europa.eu/doceo/document/TA-4-1995-07-13_EN.pd B4-0968/95 Resolution on discriminatory treatment on the grounds of nationality for foreign language teachers ('lettori') at Verona University (Italy), in violation of Article 48 of the EEC Treaty.

== The Years 2000 to the Present ==
Beginning in the early 2000s, the University of Verona expanded both its academic offerings and its infrastructure. Among the most significant developments were the growths of its scientific and technological departments and the restorations and redevelopment of Santa Marta complex. In the 1999-2000 academic year, the University opened a branch campus in Vicenza, initially focused on the economics of international trade and related commercial studies.

In 2015, the University of Verona inaugurated a new facility within the former Bakery Building of the Santa Marta Barracks. The space was designed to accommodate the university's Economics Lbrary as well as the new premises of the departments belonging to the economic sciences area.

In 2021, a new building called "Ca' Vignal 3" was completed, dedicated to teaching activities for the degree programs in Biotechnology, Computer Science and Bioinformatics. In 2023, the expansion of the medical campus was further developed with a new building named "Biologico 3", which hosts the newly established Departments of Engineering for Innovative Medicine.

== Organization ==
These are the 13 departments into which the university is divided:

- Biotechnology
- Computer Science
- Cultures and Civilizations
- Diagnostics and Public Health
- Economics
- Engineering for Innovative Medicine
- Foreign Languages and Literatures
- Human Sciences
- Law
- Management
- Medicine
- Neurosciences, Biomedicine and Movement Sciences
- Surgery, Dentistry, Pediatrics and Gynaecology

== Libraries ==
The library system is organised around two main central libraries: the Arturo Frinzi Library, serving the humanities, economics and law areas, and the Egidio Meneghetti Library, serving the medical, scientific, and technological areas. Since 2015, the Santa Marta complex has also housed its own dedicated library. The library system further includes 12 specialized libraries within departments and centers in the humanities, economics and legal area and 19 specialized libraries in the medical, scientific, and technological area. It also includes the audiovisual centre "Pietro Roveda", which provides audiovisual resources for teaching and research.

== EU-GIFT ==
The University of Verona is the only Italian university participating in the European network EU-GIFT, a project focused on research and innovation in the agri-food and wine sectors. The project involves 7 European universities and 26 associated partners.

== Rectors ==
- Carlo Vanzetti (1982-1983)
- Hrayr Terzian (1983-1986)
- Sebastiano Cassarino (1986-1992)
- Mario Marigo (1992-1997)
- Elio Mosele (1999-2004)
- Alessandro Mazzucco (2004-2013)
- Nicola Sartor (2013-2019)
- Pier Francesco Nocini (2019-2025)
- Chiara Leardini (2025-)

== See also ==
- List of Italian universities
- Verona
