= Institute for the Supervision of Insurance =

The Institute for the Supervision of Insurance (in Italian Istituto per la vigilanza sulle assicurazioni also known as IVASS) is the Italian insurance supervisory authority, an independent authority responsible for supervising and regulating all insurance business in Italy. Effective January 1, 2013, the former insurance authority, ISVAP, transferred all its assets and responsibilities to the Italian Insurance Supervisory Authority, which had a new governance, integrated with that of Banca d'Italia.

The President of IVASS is the Senior Deputy Governor of the Banca d'Italia, Fabio Panetta.

IVASS increasingly implements policies set at the European Union level. It is a voting member of the Board of Supervisors of the European Insurance and Occupational Pensions Authority (EIOPA). It is also a member of the European Systemic Risk Board (ESRB).

== See also ==
- Insurance companies of Italy
- European System of Financial Supervisors
- List of financial supervisory authorities by country
