= Vialone Nano =

Italian rice variety

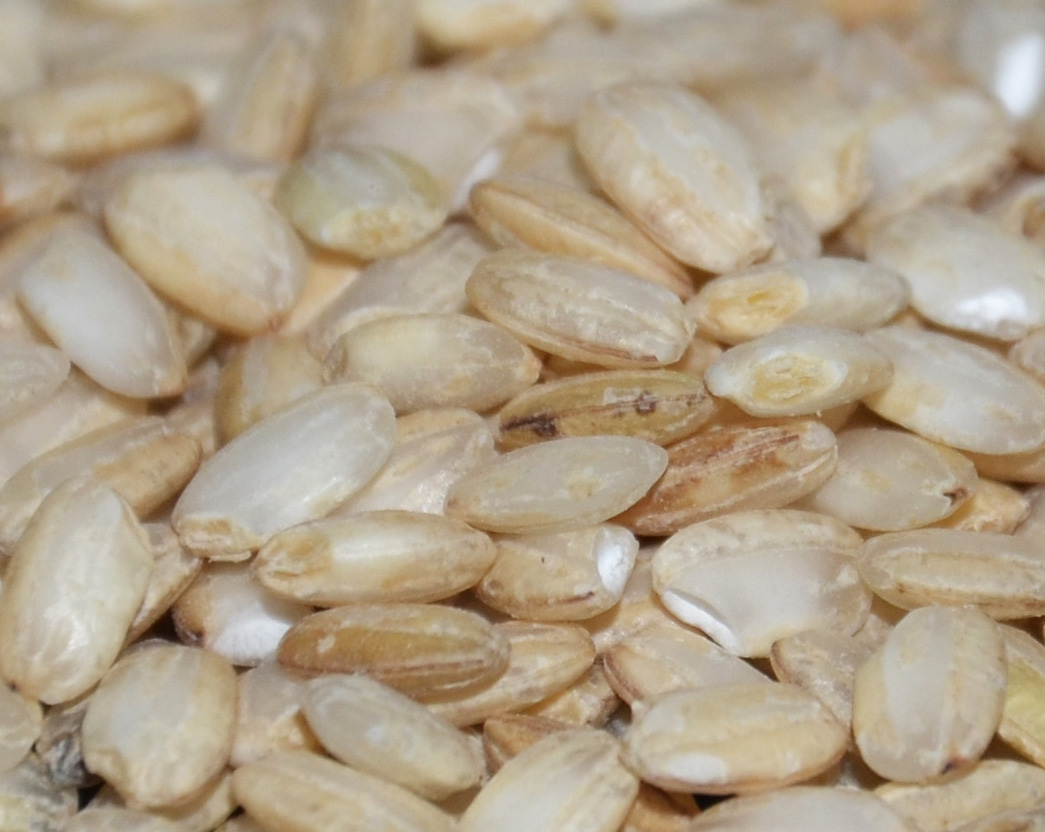
Grains of semi-milled Vialone Nano rice

Vialone Nano is an Italian semifino (medium-grain) rice variety. It is typical of the flat, rice-growing areas in the south of the province of Verona (Bassa Veronese), in Veneto. Vialone Nano is a cultivar of the Japonica group of varieties of Oryza sativa.

== Culinary uses ==
Similar to the Carnaroli, Vialone Nano is an appreciated risotto rice. While rich in starch (therefore making for creamy risottos), its high amylose content allows it to maintain its shape and absorb much liquid during cooking.

== Riso Nano Vialone Veronese IGP ==
Vialone Nano rice has been grown in Italy since 1937. It was developed by crossing Vialone rice with a variety called Nano because of the plant's low height.

In 1996 Veronese Vialone Nano rice was given the protected geographical indication (IGP), under the name of Riso Nano Vialone Veronese IGP.

The processed grain should be of medium size, round in shape and semi-long with pronounced tooth and rounded section. It should appear white in color and display an extended pearlescent core.

=== Area of production ===
Cultivation and processing of Nano Vialone Veronese IGP is conducted exclusively in the territory of the following 24 municipalities, all within the Provincia di Verona:

- Bovolone
- Buttapietra
- Casaleone
- Cerea
- Concamarise
- Erbè
- Gazzo Veronese
- Isola della Scala
- Isola Rizza
- Mozzecane
- Nogara
- Nogarole Rocca
- Oppeano
- Palù
- Povegliano Veronese
- Ronco all'Adige
- Roverchiara
- Salizzole
- Sanguinetto
- San Pietro di Morubio
- Sorgà
- Trevenzuolo
- Vigasio
- Zevio

== See also ==
- Arborio
- Carnaroli
- Risotto
- Italian cuisine
