= Risotto alla ticinese =

Swiss dish

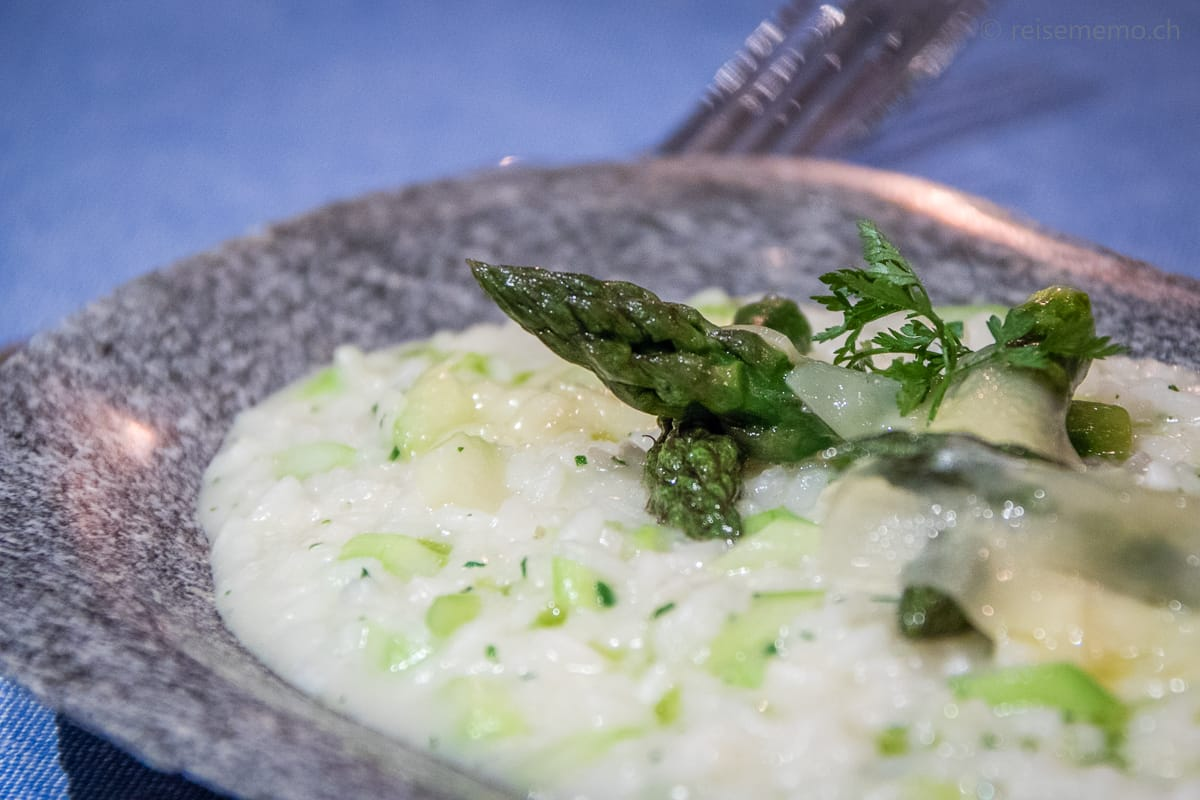
White Merlot risotto, served in a restaurant

Risotto alla ticinese is a risotto dish from the Swiss canton of Ticino. It is typically prepared with regional Merlot wine and served with luganighe sausages.

The dish is typically prepared with short-grain risotto rice such as Loto, Carnaroli or Arborio, first slightly roasted in oil, then cooked slowly with broth and finished with butter and grated cheese to achieve a creamy texture. Regional Merlot wine, often red, is used to deglaze the pan at the beginning and contributes aroma and color. Mushrooms, such as porcini, are also frequently added to the dish. The most common accompaniment is the luganiga (or the thinner luganighetta), the emblematic fresh pork sausage of the canton.

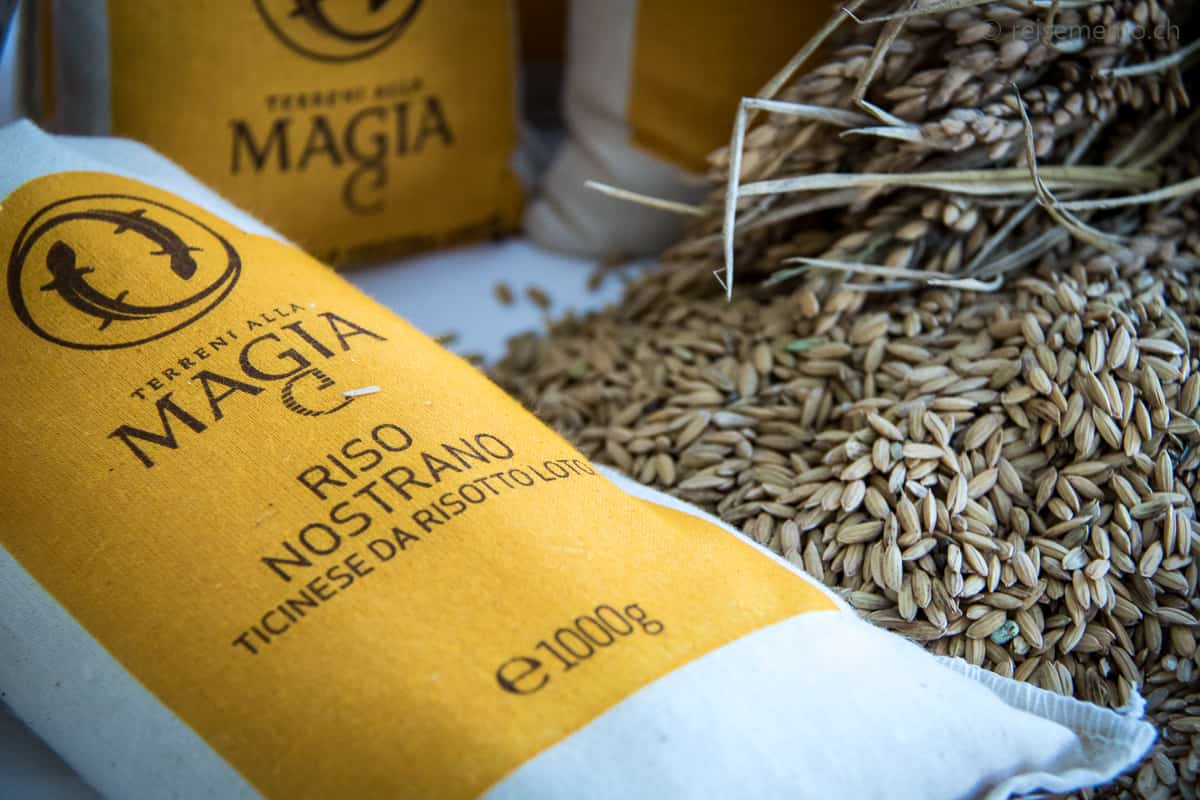
Regional Loto rice

Along with polenta, risotto has become a staple food in Ticino. It has been served since the 19th century in festive contexts, sometimes with saffron. Risotto in general is widely served in homes and restaurants and also plays an important role in communal food traditions. During local festivals and public events in towns such as Bellinzona and Locarno, large quantities of risotto are often prepared outdoors in copper cauldrons and shared among participants; this event is called risottata. The dish is commonly accompanied by regional wines and cheeses.

Rice is mostly imported from the neighboring Italian regions. Since the 1990s, Loto rice is also cultivated in the Maggia delta between Ascona and Locarno. Nearby in Taverne is Switzerland's largest rice mill.

== See also ==
- Riz Casimir, another rice dish from Switzerland
- Swiss cuisine
