= Agriculture in Italy =

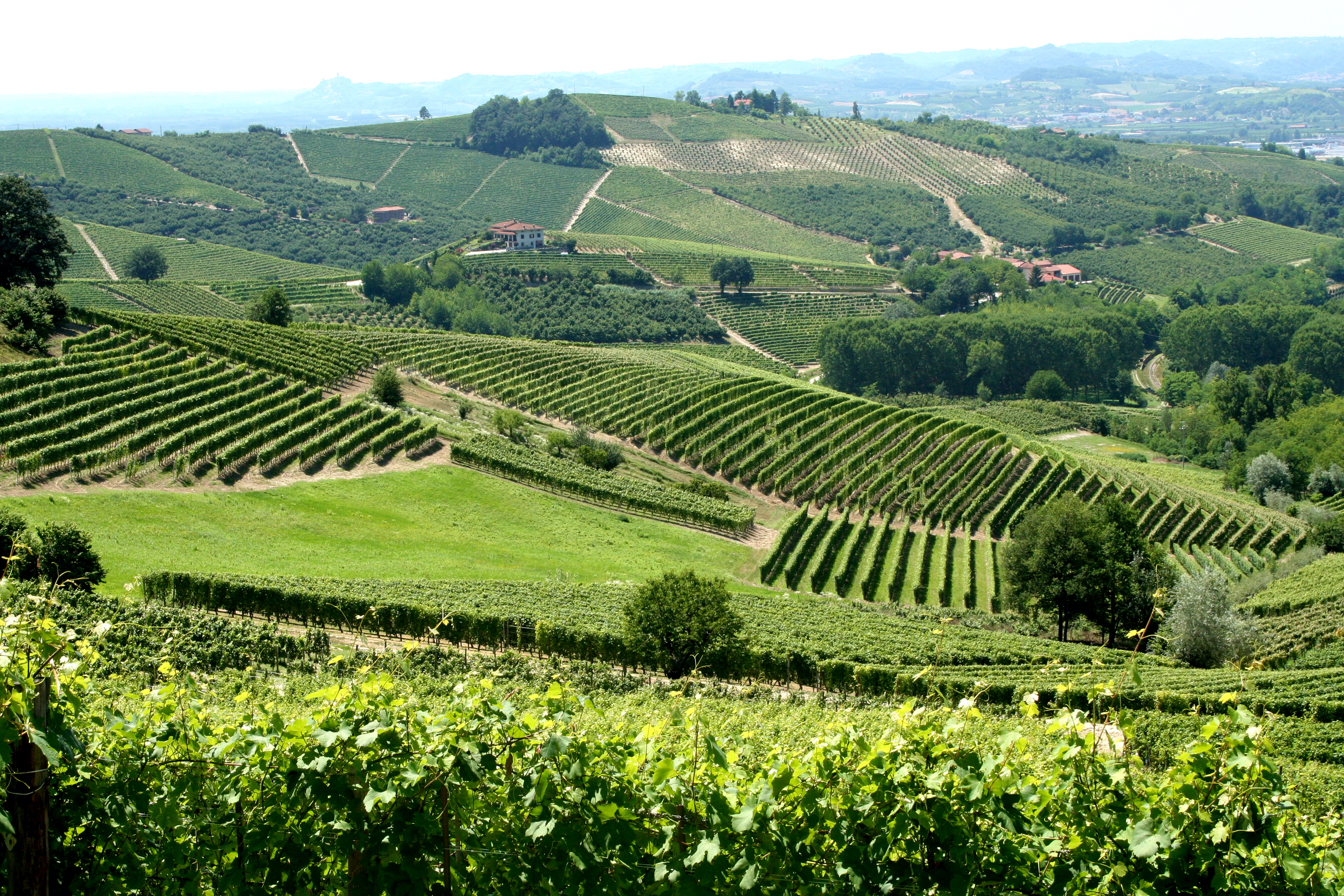
Vineyards in Langhe and Montferrat, Piedmont. Italy is the world's largest wine producer (22% of global market), as well as the country with the widest variety of indigenous grapevine in the world.

Agriculture in Italy, one of the economic sectors of the country, has developed since the 5th millennium BC. In the 19th century, Italy transformed from a predominantly agricultural country to an industrial country. As a result, the agricultural sector (including silviculture and fishing) has seen employment drop dramatically, from 43% (in 1860) to 3.8% (in 2000) of the total, a minimal percentage in the national economic framework.

According to the last national agricultural census, in 2010 there was 891,000 people employed in agriculture, mostly men (71.3% of the total) and resident in Southern Italy (46.8% of the total). In 2010 the Italian agricultural area was equal to 17,800,000 ha (43,984,758 acres), of which 12,700,000 ha (31,382,383 acres) are used, and is concentrated above all in Southern Italy (63%).

== Description ==
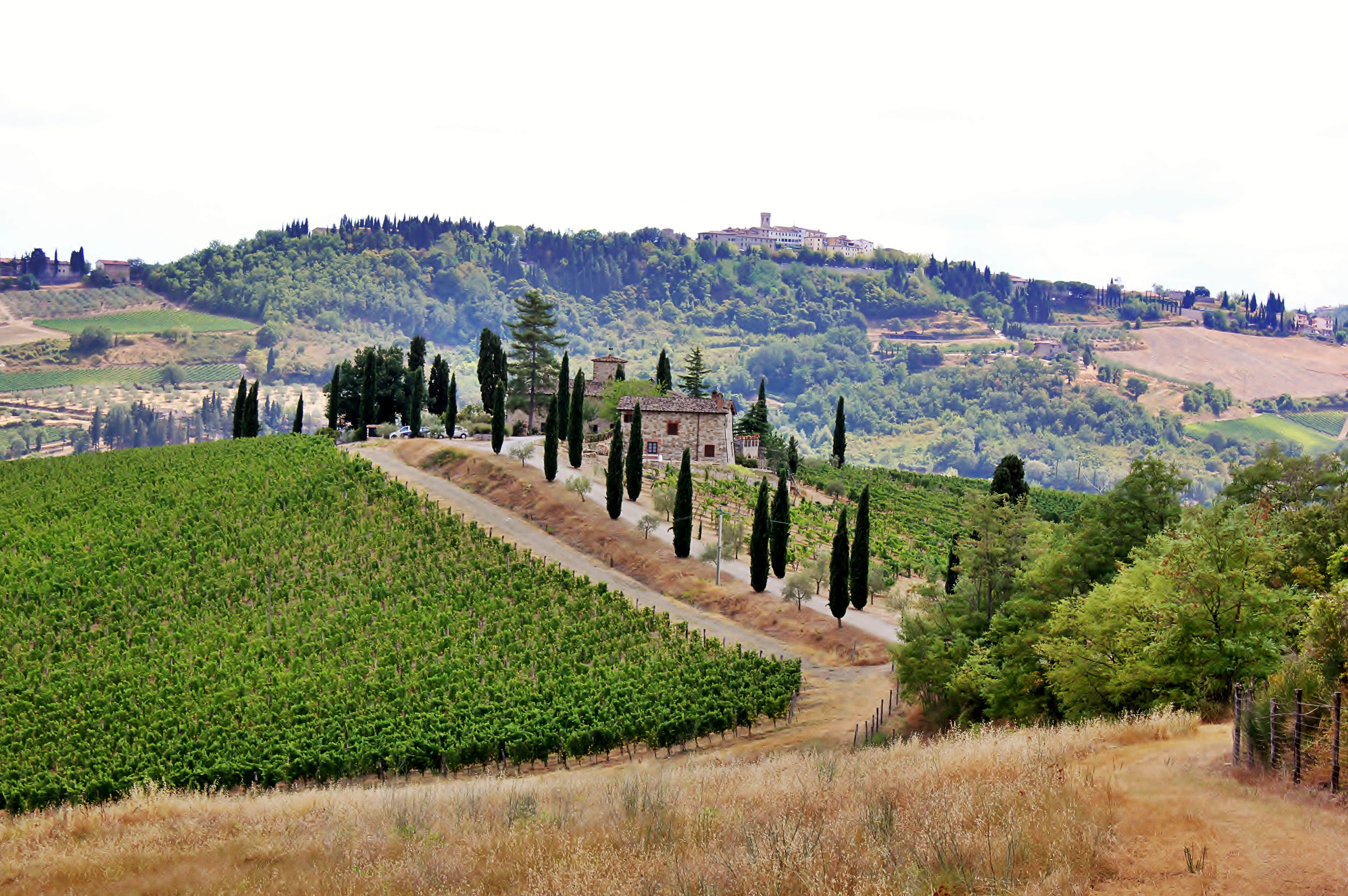
Chianti Hills, in the region of Chianti, Tuscany.

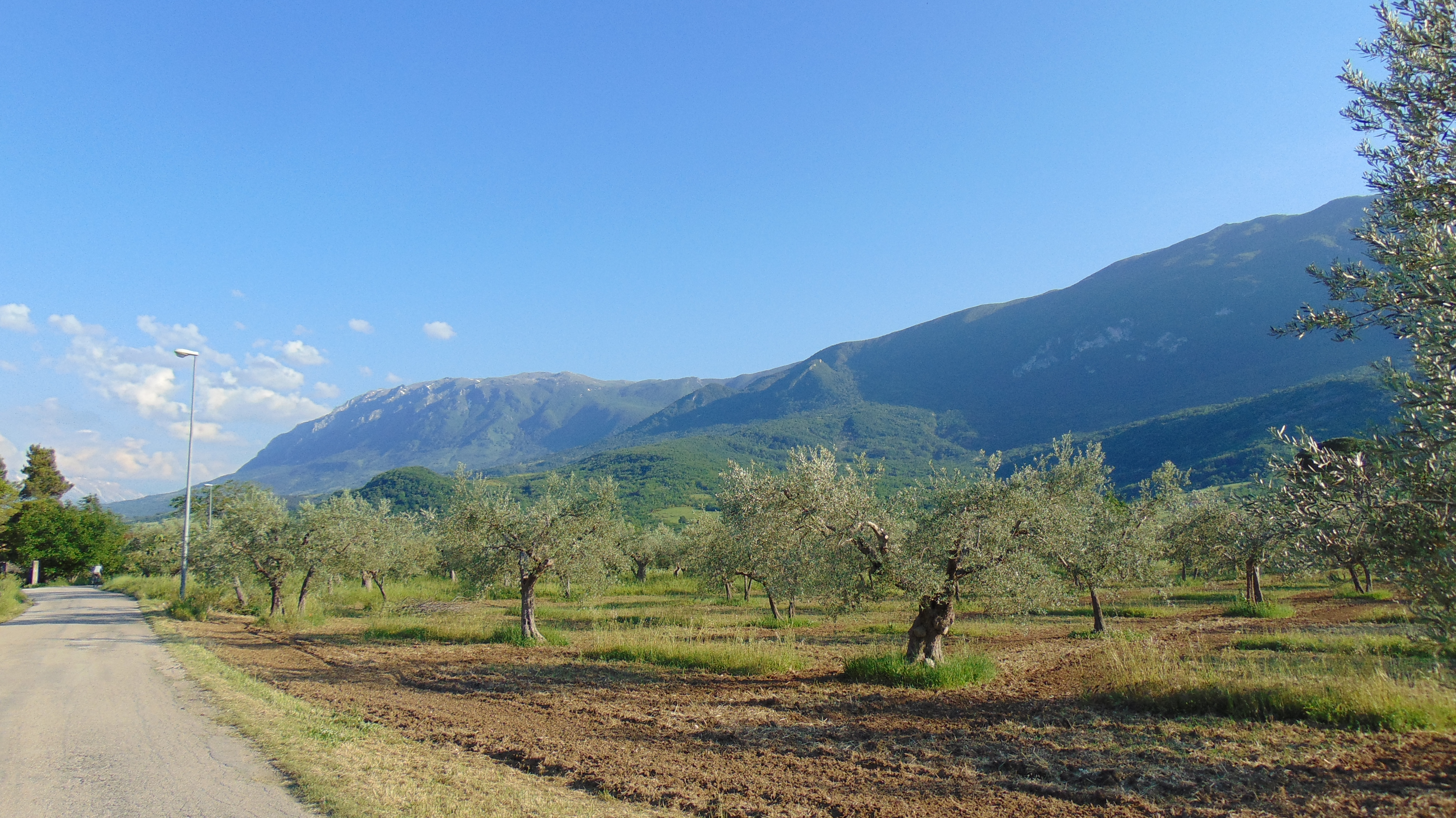
Olive grove in Abruzzo

According to the last national agricultural census, there were 1.6 million farms in 2010 (−32.4% since 2000) covering 12,700,000 ha or 31,382,383 acres (63% of which are located in Southern Italy). The vast majority (99%) are family-operated and small, averaging only 8 ha (20 acres) in size. Of the total surface area in agricultural use (forestry excluded), grain fields take up 31%, olive tree orchards 8.2%, vineyards 5.4%, citrus orchards 3.8%, sugar beets 1.7%, and horticulture 2.4%. The remainder is primarily dedicated to pastures (25.9%) and feed grains (11.6%). The northern part of Italy produces primarily Maize corn, rice, sugar beets, soybeans, meat, fruits and dairy products, while the South specializes in wheat and citrus fruits. Livestock includes 6 million head of cattle, 8.6 million head of swine, 6.8 million head of sheep, and 0.9 million head of goats. The total annual production of the fishing industry in Italy from capture and aquaculture, including crustaceans and molluscs, is around 480,000 tons.

Italy is the largest producer of wine in the world, and one of the leading producers of olive oil, fruits (apples, olives, grapes, oranges, lemons, pears, apricots, hazelnuts, peaches, cherries, plums, strawberries, and kiwifruits), and vegetables (especially artichokes and tomatoes). The most famous Italian wines are probably the Tuscan Chianti and the Piedmontese Barolo. Other famous wines are Barbaresco, Barbera d'Asti, Brunello di Montalcino, Frascati, Montepulciano d'Abruzzo, Morellino di Scansano, Amarone della Valpolicella DOCG and the sparkling wines Franciacorta and Prosecco. Quality goods in which Italy specialises, particularly the already mentioned wines and regional cheeses, are often protected under the quality assurance labels DOC/DOP. This geographical indication certificate, which is attributed by the European Union, is considered important to avoid confusion with low-quality mass-produced ersatz products. Italy is the largest producer of rice in the European Union, producing around half of the bloc's rice output.

In fact, Italian cuisine is one of the most popular and copied around the world. The lack or total unavailability of some of its most characteristic ingredients outside of Italy, also and above all to falsifications (or food fraud), leads to the complete denaturalization of Italian ingredients. This phenomenon, widespread in all continents, is better known as Italian Sounding, consisting in the use of words as well as images, colour combinations (the Italian tricolour), geographical references, brands evocative of Italy to promote and market agri-food products which in reality have nothing to do with Italian cuisine.

== History ==
=== Prehistory ===
Approximate centers of origin of agriculture in the Neolithic Revolution and its spread in prehistory as understood in 2003.

Several archaeological finds show that the first agricultural settlements began in Italy around the 5th millennium BC. Archaeologists have clearly identified the paths followed by the first Anatolian peasants who spread the Neolithic Revolution across the European continent, primarily on the Mediterranean coast and along the Danube. Initially they arrived in Sicily by sea, where they founded agricultural villages similar to those of the Fertile Crescent (Anatolia, Syria, Palestine, the valleys of the Tigris and Euphrates).

Later, after having crossed the Alpine arc, the peasants who came from the Danube built villages with the same characteristics as those of the Neolithic in the Balkans, which, in the space of a millennium, recorded considerable developments.

=== Ancient history ===
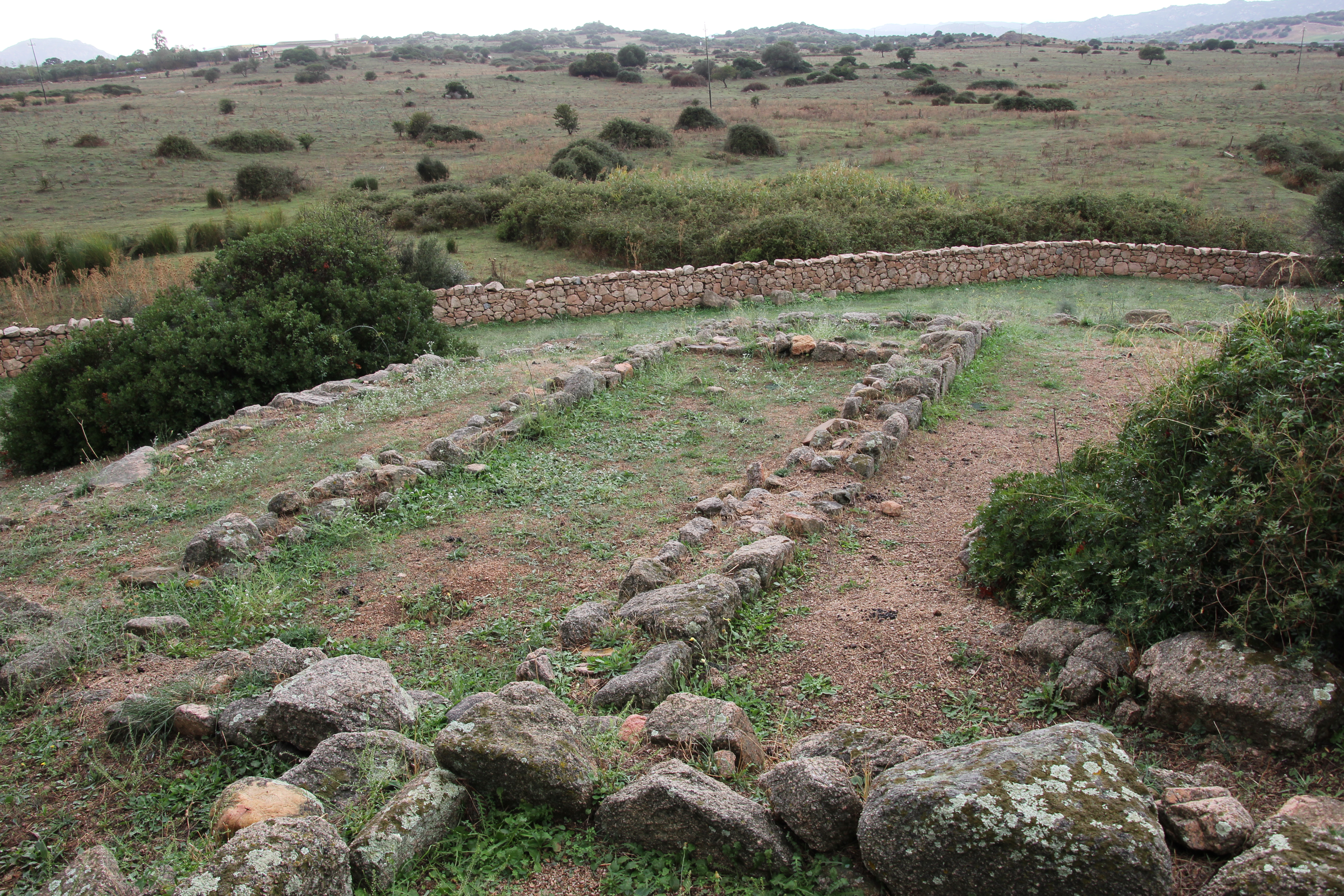
The remains of an ancient Roman farm in Olbia, Sardinia

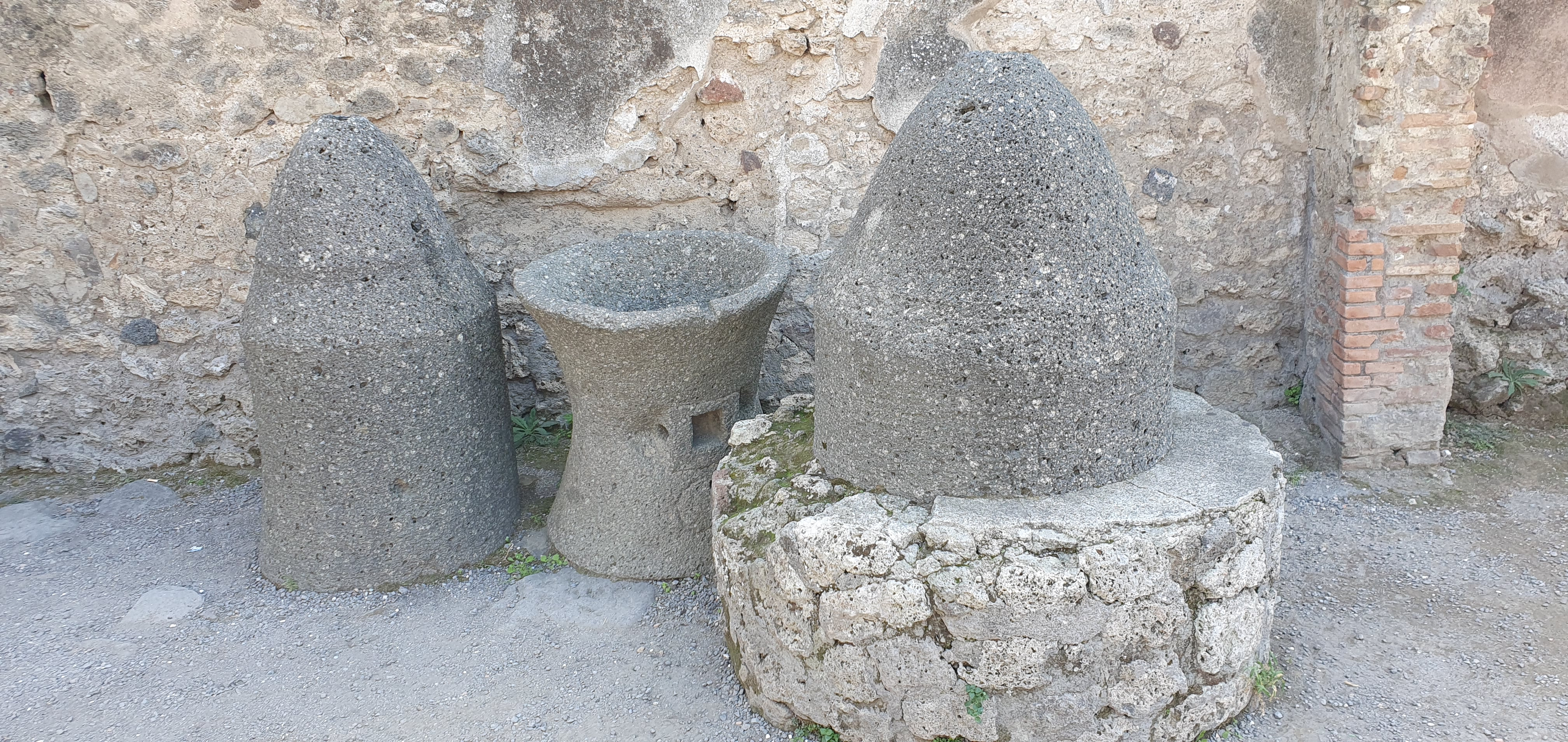
The remains of an ancient Roman mill in Pompeii, Campania

In the Bronze Age, the entire Po plain was colonized thanks to the so-called "terramare", dwellings similar to stilts. These inhabitants had perfected the methods of cultivation and breeding adopted in the Neolithic Period, which remained substantially the same until the Middle Ages. Also in Central Italy it is the starting period to a peasant society with increasing agricultural diversity. But locations were dominantly in hilly terrain using a slash-and-burn method. Mediterranean type ploughs with convertible wooden ploughshares were used. In South Italy first evidence of olive cultivation can be observed in this time.

The Iron Age saw the appearance of brick houses in rural areas, breeding of livestock, cultivation of fabaceae, accumulation of bronze objects, craftsmenship, trade and individualism. The time of the Roman Republic was dominated by the revolution of iron: ploughshares, pick-axes on the fields (enabling the cultivation of heavy soils), sickles and axes for deforestation as well as iron material for harvesting and pruning of grapes. It was the origin of a landscape with mixed cultures and systematic planning of the terrain around the cities. There was a great development of agricultural technology including haymaking, laying fallow of grounds and hydraulic works (cunicoli). And the commercial grape-olive-culture evolved. The East had developed great empires based on the cultivation of cereals, mainly wheat and barley: Rome, which established itself at the center of the peninsula, conquered many of the great plains of the then known world, assigning each of them a specific function based on its plans of economic and military domination.

Countries whose borders were not threatened by powerful enemies were exploited to feed the population of Rome, the "womb" of the Empire, where hundreds of thousands of former warrior peasants, stripped of their land by the aristocracy and the mercantile class, claimed their right to receive bread and circuses (panem et circences) as citizens of the state. Countries close to threatened borders, such as the Rhine and the Danube, were responsible for producing the grain needed to feed the legions encamped on the edge, as in the case of France.

To meet the high demand for food from the central areas of the empire, and from Rome itself, especially from the wealthier classes, the first techniques of cultivation, fruit and vegetables, breeding, pigs, sheep, poultry were developed, pre-industrial in nature. Analyzing the characteristics of this agriculture, designed to satisfy the strong demand, both in terms of quantity and quality, the Spaniard Lucio Giunio Moderato Columella, owner of the vineyards between the "Castelli Romani", wrote the first scientific treatise concerning the techniques of agriculture in the western world.

=== Medieval history ===
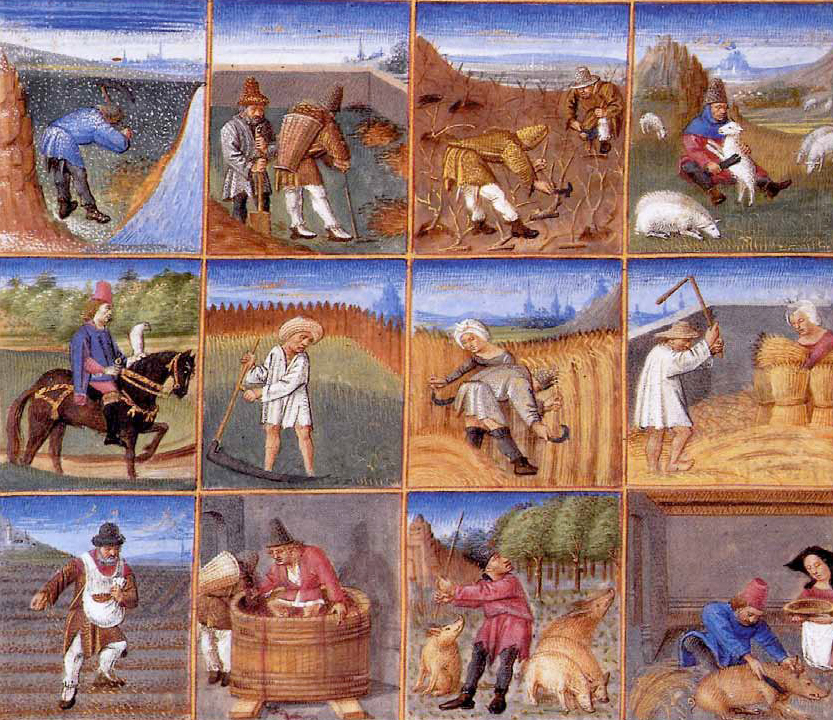
Agricultural calendar, c. 1470, from a manuscript of Pietro de Crescenzi

After the end of the Empire, and for almost a thousand years, agriculture and the economy experienced a period of technological regression, closer to that of the Bronze Age both in Greece and in the regions of Roman Italy. Productivity decreased, but the rural population, living in small villages scattered in a territory of woods and swamps, still managed to derive a significant part of their livelihood from natural habitats, such as meadows and swamps: meat, fish, honey, furs, fabrics.

Towards the end of the Middle Ages, when the first craft and trade companies developed in Europe, new agricultural systems appeared in Flanders, in the Po Valley and in the smaller plains of central Italy. In the Po Valley there has been the development of a new system of relations between man and natural resources and of an agriculture based on irrigation.

Of course, in the Middle East, irrigation allowed, thousands of years ago, an enormous production of wheat on land that has since become deserted for climatic reasons. Late medieval Italian agriculture was based on particularly intensive farming, and on the production of textiles, fruit and vegetables on a large scale.

=== Modern history ===
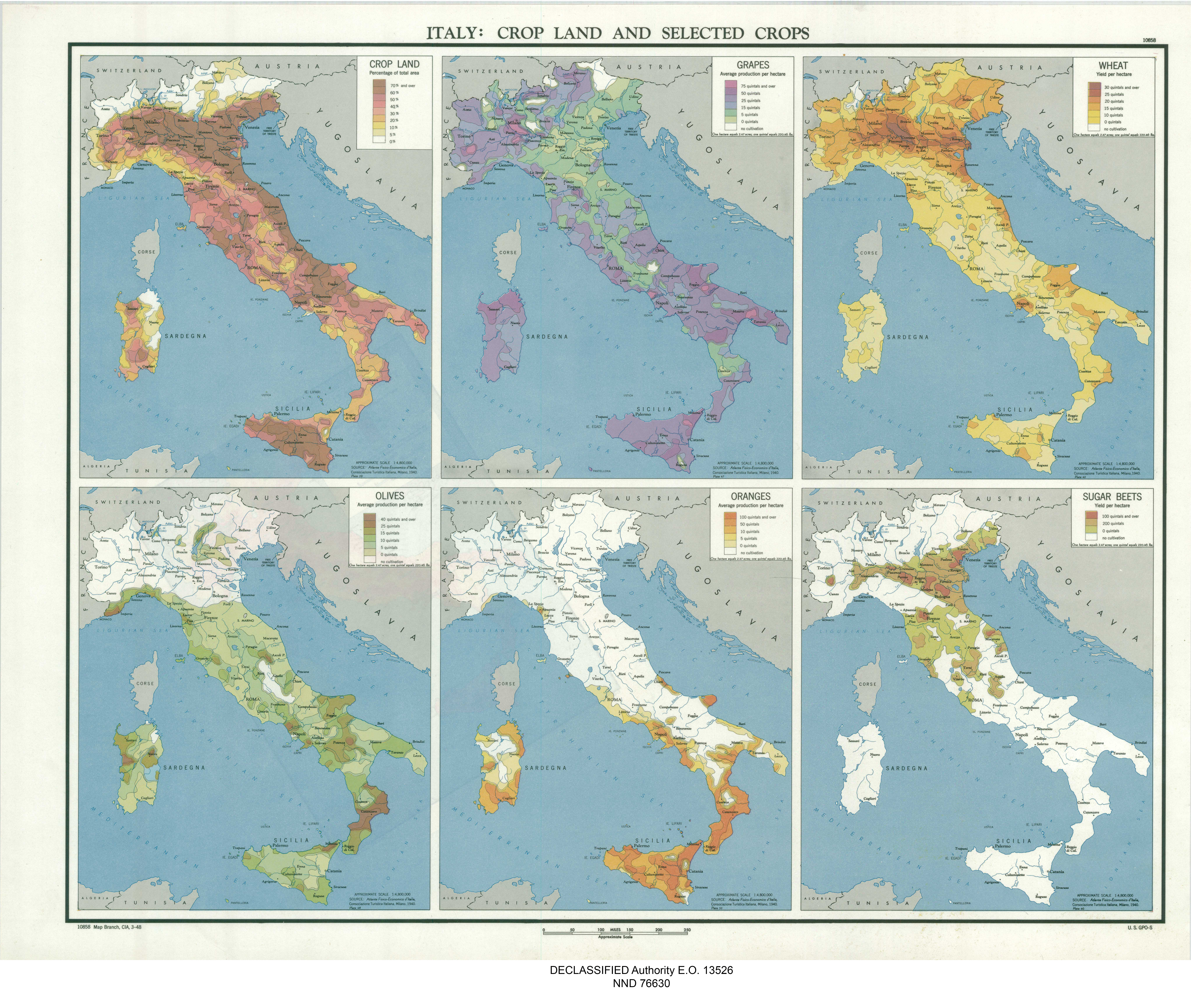
Production of selected crops, 1948

Favored by the abundance of food, Italian cities became the area of greatest export of the most sought-after products: wool, weapons, glass, cheese. The extraordinary wealth of the Italian cities was not adequately protected by a political and military force proportionate to their opulence, prompting two major powers of the time, France and Spain, to send their armies.

For two centuries, the fertile fields of the peninsula transformed one of the richest countries on the continent into a land of economic and civil misery, of which the chronicles of the seventeenth century bear witness. During the Enlightenment, Lombard agriculture resumed its growth by increasing the wealth of the countryside surrounding Milan, with products such as cheese and silk, making this city one of the richest in Europe, becoming one of the great cultural capitals of this extraordinary period of European History.

=== Contemporary history ===
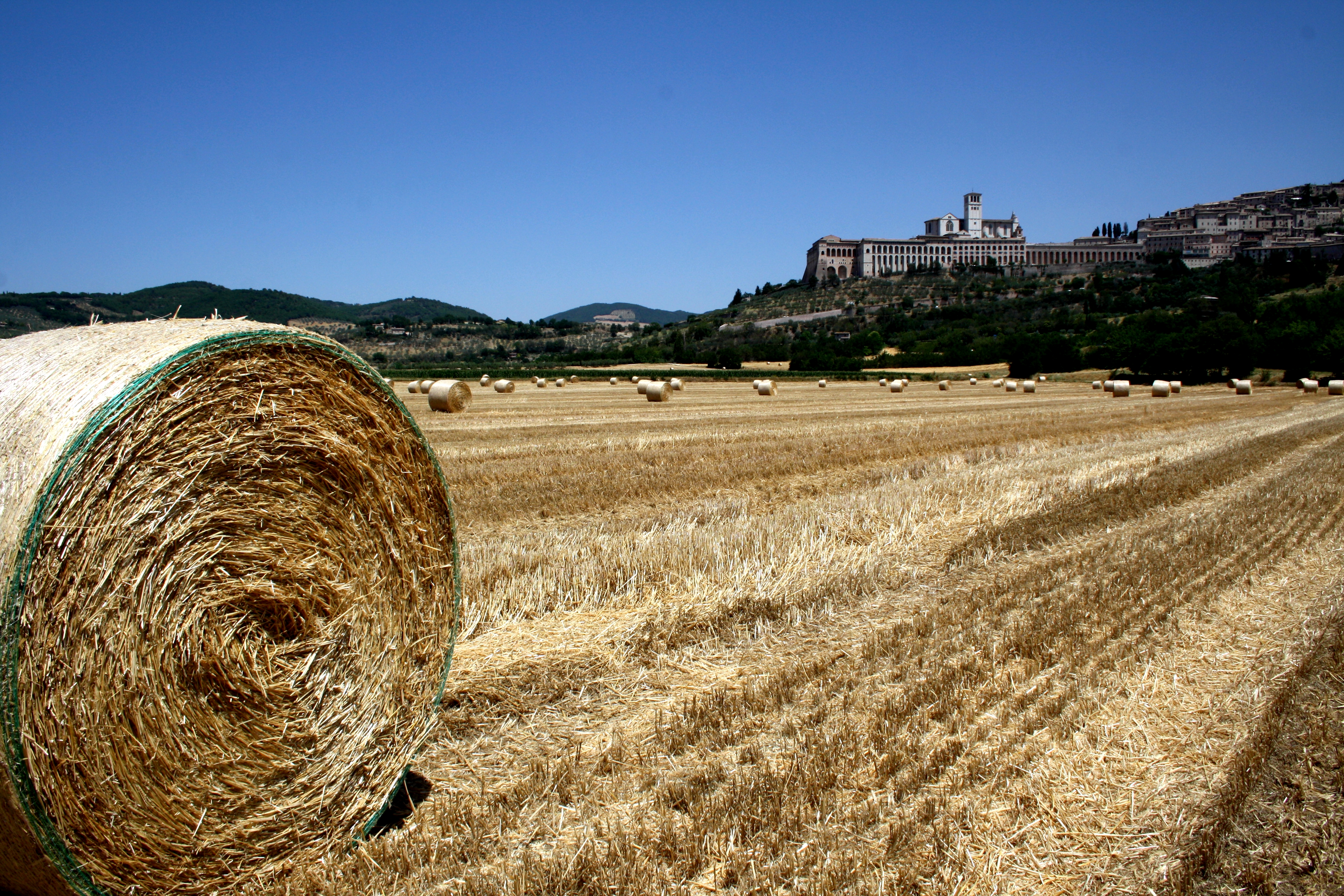
Cultivated field in Umbria. On background, the Basilica of Saint Francis of Assisi

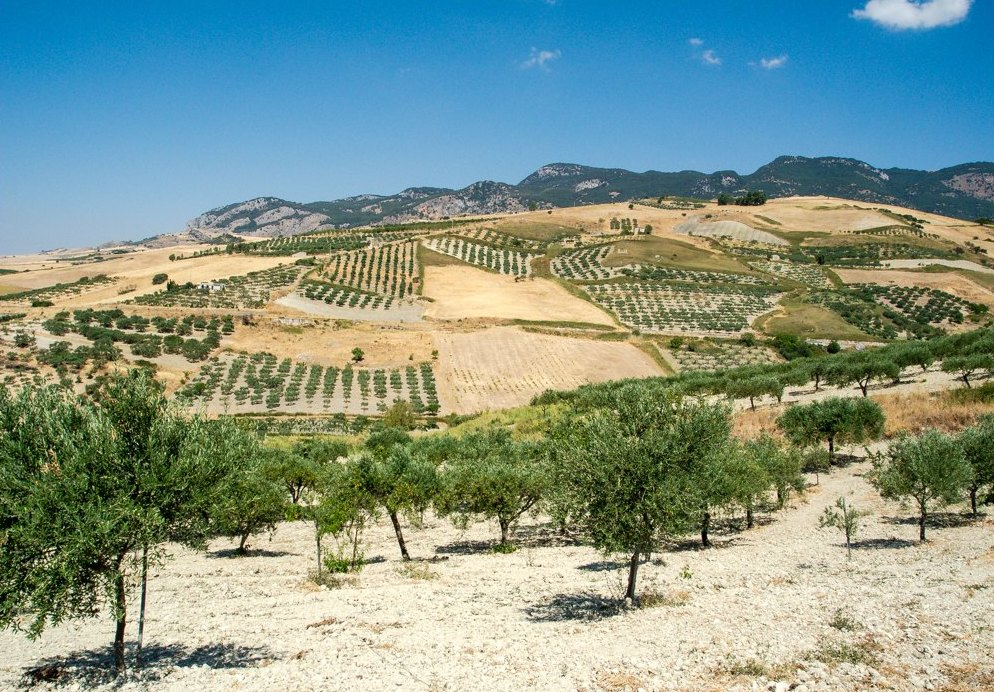
Olive grove in Sicily

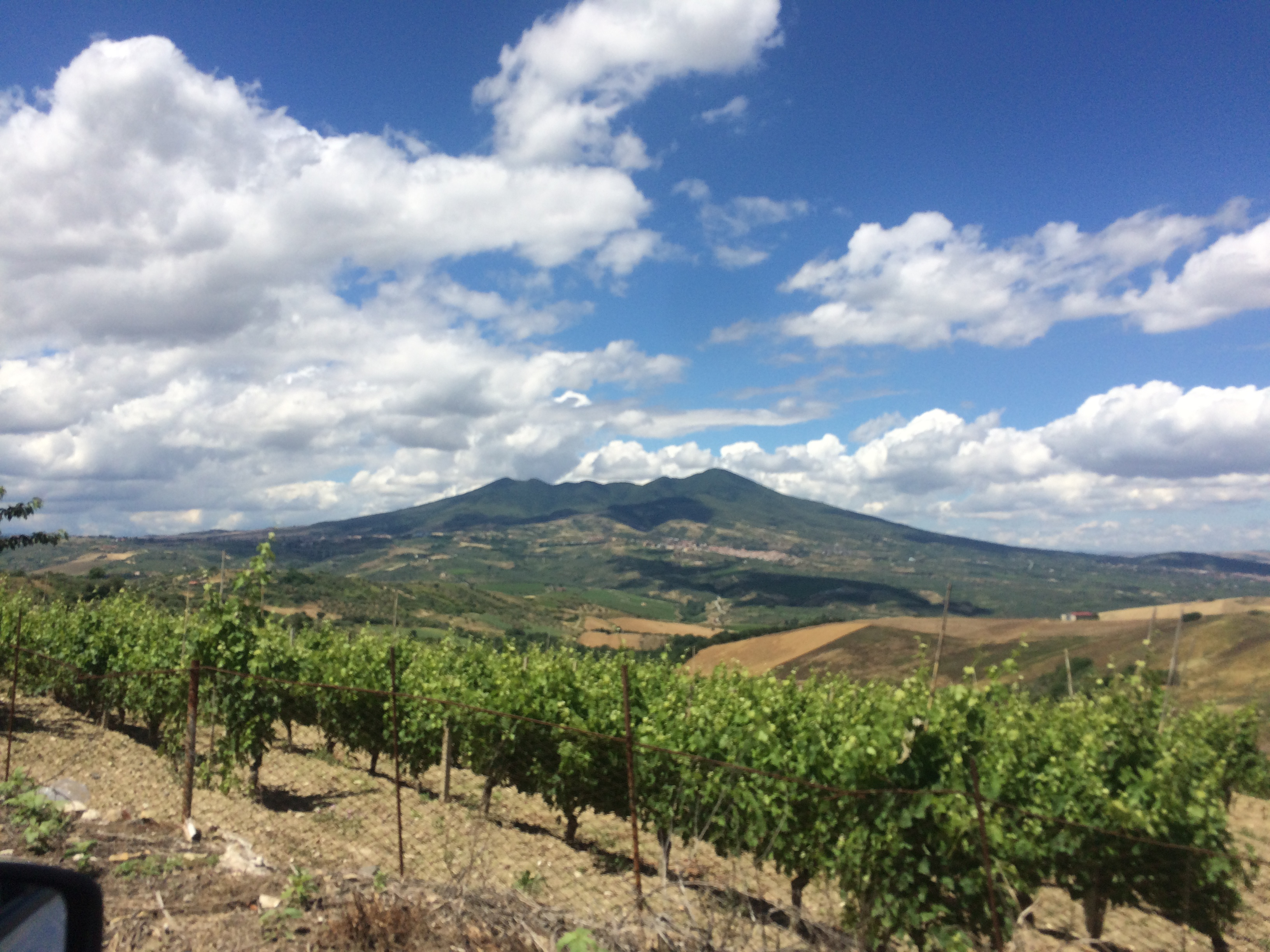
Aglianico vineyard with Mount Vulture in the background

The 19th century was the period of the "Risorgimento", a movement in which the peasant classes did not take part. This movement resulted in a form of government in which landowners, the beneficiaries of backward agriculture, were the majority, so they took the opportunity to exploit the condition of the peasantry to their advantage to strengthen their privileges. At the end of the century, we can say that offloading the costs of the agrarian crisis on farmers was the only concern of the first unitary parliaments.

The extraordinary period that began at the end of the century, with the governments of Giovanni Giolitti, that opened Italy to new horizons of economic and social progress, progress interrupted too soon by the Great War and followed by a long period of political stagnation. This convinced the ever powerful families of large landowners to resort to fascism, with an agricultural policy aimed at increasing the production of wheat to provide the energy necessary for the resurrection of the splendors of ancient Rome. All other aspects of agricultural progress were completely ignored.

At the end of the Second World War, food production in the country could only count on a more backward agriculture, also hampered by the damage caused by the war. In that period Giuseppe Medici, a famous agronomist and statesman of international standing, became Minister of Agriculture. Also thanks to his interventions, Italy was the first country to host an international conference of agricultural researchers, a conference that allowed the creation of links between research programs capable of increasing interactions and exchanges, to increase the production efficiency in agriculture.

In the thirty years that followed the war there was the birth, in the peninsula, of a generation of great agronomists, scientists engaged in the territory outside the traditional schemes. In Europe, agricultural techniques were completely renewed and the first livestock farms were created on the American model, based on the cultivation of hybrid maize, a completely new production framework was outlined in the fruit and viticulture sector, which will then be able to compete, in the following decades, with French agriculture.

== Statistics ==
The data relating to the surface of agricultural holdings for the Italian regions and macroregions are shown below.

=== Regions ===

Region	1999	2003	2005	2007
Piedmont	1,533,894 ha (3,790,335 acres)	1,467,267 ha (3,625,696 acres)	1,459,843 ha (3,607,351 acres)	1,403,893 ha (3,469,095 acres)
Aosta Valley	135,927 ha (335,883 acres)	127,458 ha (314,956 acres)	159,842 ha (394,978 acres)	147,741 ha (365,076 acres)
Lombardy	1,392,331 ha (3,440,525 acres)	1,235,447 ha (3,052,856 acres)	1,355,039 ha (3,348,374 acres)	1,258,471 ha (3,109,750 acres)
Liguria	184,884 ha (456,858 acres)	138,509 ha (342,263 acres)	153,851 ha (380,174 acres)	135,065 ha (333,753 acres)
Trentino-Alto Adige/Südtirol	999,714 ha (2,470,347 acres)	991,674 ha (2,450,480 acres)	987,294 ha (2,439,657 acres)	983,005 ha (2,429,058 acres)
Veneto	1,067,788 ha (2,638,562 acres)	1,171,604 ha (2,895,097 acres)	1,170,343 ha (2,891,981 acres)	1,121,386 ha (2,771,005 acres)
Friuli Venezia Giulia	386,922 ha (956,105 acres)	299,603 ha (740,335 acres)	392,692 ha (970,363 acres)	361,868 ha (894,195 acres)
Emilia-Romagna	1,576,967 ha (3,896,770 acres)	1,368,911 ha (3,382,653 acres)	1,440,156 ha (3,558,703 acres)	1,340,654 ha (3,312,828 acres)
Tuscany	1,664,674 ha (4,113,499 acres)	1,495,329 ha (3,695,038 acres)	1,543,548 ha (3,814,190 acres)	1,458,301 ha (3,603,540 acres)
Umbria	588,372 ha (1,453,899 acres)	634,615 ha (1,568,168 acres)	622,100 ha (1,537,243 acres)	585,144 ha (1,445,922 acres)
Marche	818,809 ha (2,023,321 acres)	686,552 ha (1,696,507 acres)	694,702 ha (1,716,646 acres)	671,481 ha (1,659,266 acres)
Lazio	1,128,164 ha (2,787,754 acres)	1,024,701 ha (2,532,091 acres)	1,020,391 ha (2,521,441 acres)	940,447 ha (2,323,895 acres)
Abruzzo	753,945 ha (1,863,039 acres)	623,341 ha (1,540,309 acres)	640,545 ha (1,582,821 acres)	657,272 ha (1,624,154 acres)
Molise	316,797 ha (782,822 acres)	261,876 ha (647,110 acres)	281,762 ha (696,249 acres)	265,463 ha (655,973 acres)
Campania	839,235 ha (2,073,795 acres)	769,198 ha (1,900,730 acres)	822,277 ha (2,031,891 acres)	777,493 ha (1,921,227 acres)
Apulia	1,547,972 ha (3,825,122 acres)	1,377,721 ha (3,404,423 acres)	1,342,587 ha (3,317,605 acres)	1,317,444 ha (3,255,475 acres)
Basilicata	748,278 ha (1,849,035 acres)	702,417 ha (1,735,710 acres)	694,127 ha (1,715,225 acres)	715,784 ha (1,768,741 acres)
Calabria	837,877 ha (2,070,439 acres)	781,893 ha (1,932,100 acres)	822,403 ha (2,032,202 acres)	757,943 ha (1,872,918 acres)
Sicily	1,739,829 ha (4,299,211 acres)	1,459,612 ha (3,606,780 acres)	1,426,513 ha (3,524,990 acres)	1,415,233 ha (3,497,117 acres)
Sardinia	1,901,397 ha (4,698,454 acres)	1,614,842 ha (3,990,361 acres)	1,586,844 ha (3,921,177 acres)	1,527,457 ha (3,774,428 acres)
Italy	20,163,776 ha (49,825,776 acres)	18,232,570 ha (45,053,662 acres)	18,616,859 ha (46,003,260 acres)	17,841,544 ha (44,087,415 acres)

=== Macroregions ===
Territory	1999	2003	2005	2007
Northwest Italy	3,247,036 ha (8,023,601 acres)	2,968,681 ha (7,335,771 acres)	3,128,575 ha (7,730,877 acres)	2,945,170 ha (7,277,674 acres)
Northeast Italy	4,031,391 ha (9,961,784 acres)	3,831,791 ha (9,468,562 acres)	3,990,485 ha (9,860,703 acres)	3,806,913 ha (9,407,087 acres)
Central Italy	4,200,019 ha (10,378,473 acres)	3,841,197 ha (9,491,804 acres)	3,880,742 ha (9,589,522 acres)	3,655,373 ha (9,032,623 acres)
South Italy	5,044,104 ha (12,464,252 acres)	4,516,447 ha (11,160,384 acres)	4,603,701 ha (11,375,993 acres)	4,491,399 ha (11,098,489 acres)
Insular Italy	3,641,226 ha (8,997,665 acres)	3,074,455 ha (7,597,144 acres)	3,013,356 ha (7,446,165 acres)	2,942,690 ha (7,271,545 acres)
Italy	20,163,776 ha (49,825,776 acres)	18,232,570 ha (45,053,662 acres)	18,616,859 ha (46,003,260 acres)	17,841,544 ha (44,087,415 acres)

== See also ==
- Agriculture in ancient Rome
- Cascina a corte
- Dairy farming in Italy
- Economy of Italy
- Italian wine
- Traditional Italian maize varieties

== Bibliography ==
- Emilio Sereni (1997). History of the Italian Agricultural Landscape. Princeton University Press. ISBN 978-06-9101-215-5.
- Istituto nazionale di economia agraria (2011). L'agricoltura italiana conta 2011 (in Italian). ISBN 978-88-8145-324-5.

== Externals links ==
- "Confagricoltura". Confagricoltura - Confederazione Generale dell'Agricoltura Italiana (in Italian).
- "L'agricoltura in Italia" (in Italian).
- "L'agricoltura italiana conta" (in Italian).
