= Rice production in Italy =

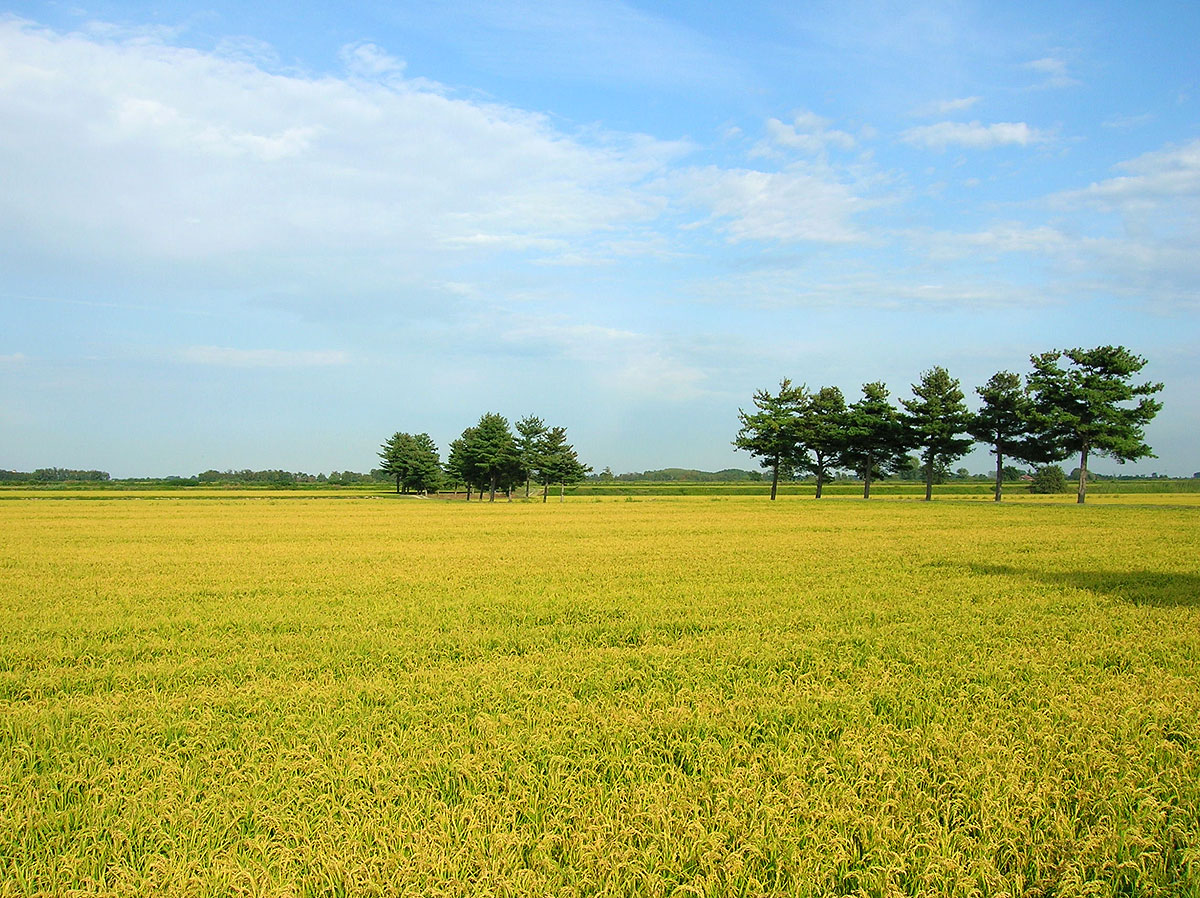
A rice field near Vespolate.

Italy's rice production is the largest in Europe, with a large proportion of the local production being exported. The country produces over 1 million tonnes of rice annually, roughly half of the European Union's production. Rice cultivation was introduced to Italy following the Muslim conquest of Sicily, and later spread to the Po Valley during the fifteenth century with the region still remaining Italy's main production center. The provinces of Vercelli and Pavia are the largest producers in the country.

== History ==
The cultivation of rice in modern Italy began in Sicily following its conquest by Muslims. Sicily continued to be a major producer and exporter of rice up to the seventeenth and eighteenth centuries, but production declined due to restrictions on cultivation of rice near populated areas in a government attempt to combat malaria. By 1912, around 500 hectares of land were registered as being rice fields on the island. Sicilian rice production was further damaged and practically disappeared following the drainage of marshes in Sicily during Benito Mussolini's reign, though rice dishes such as arancini remained popular on the island. Efforts have been made in the 21st-century to revive rice cultivation there.

By the fifteenth century, rice cultivation had spread from Sicily to other parts of Italy, namely to the Po Valley in the north and to the Tuscany region. By the late eighteenth century, large rice-producing estates had emerged in the region especially in newly drained marshlands of the Po Valley. This expansion continued throughout the nineteenth century and after the unification of Italy. In the Po Valley rice fields, a group of women agricultural workers known as mondine emerged, numbering in the hundreds of thousands – 200 thousand by the time of Mussolini – and becoming the core of rural labor and socialist movements in Italy. Dictator Benito Mussolini in late the 1920s promoted the consumption of domestically produced rice over imported wheat.

== Cultivars ==
Around 80 percent of Italian rice varieties are Japonica rice, with the rest being indica rice. The main rice cultivar in the eighteenth century, Nostrale, was susceptible to the rice blast fungus, and new varieties were imported in the early 1800s from China and Japan. By 1872, five varieties of rice were cultivated in Italy, and the number increased over time. The varieties are grouped into four categories based on grain size and cooking time, with the small rounded grains ("comune") taking 12-13 minutes of cooking time and the longest grains ("super fino") being used in risotto with 16-18 minutes of cooking time.

A 2013 study recorded 183 varieties of rice cultivated in Italy, described as "nearly all traditional and modern varieties currently available". A European Union-backed promotion campaign claimed that over 200 varieties of rice are grown in Italy, including several varieties given protected designation of origin (PDO) and protected geographical indication (PGI) status. Among the most produced varieties are Arborio and Carnaroli.

== Production ==
Italy's annual rice production, as of 2025, is around 1.4 million tons. This made up around half of the total rice production of the European Union, making Italy the largest rice producer in the bloc (and in Europe). Most of Italy's rice production is exported to other European countries. 235,450 hectares of farmland were used to cultivate rice in 2025, half of which were located in Piedmont, mainly in the provinces of Vercelli and Novara. Lombardy contained another 90 thousand hectares of rice fields, mostly in Pavia. These rice-producing regions are concentrated in the Lomellina area in the two regions. Vercelli and Pavia both claim to be Italy's "capital of rice".

Droughts are a significant issue to the Italian rice industry, with droughts in 2022 causing a 30 percent loss of production, valued at around 3 billion Euroes. To adapt to reduced availability of water in the Po Valley, Italian farmers have begun adopting "dry sowing" techniques to reduce water usage.
