= San Giovanni Lupatoto =

- Comune
- Comune di San Giovanni Lupatoto
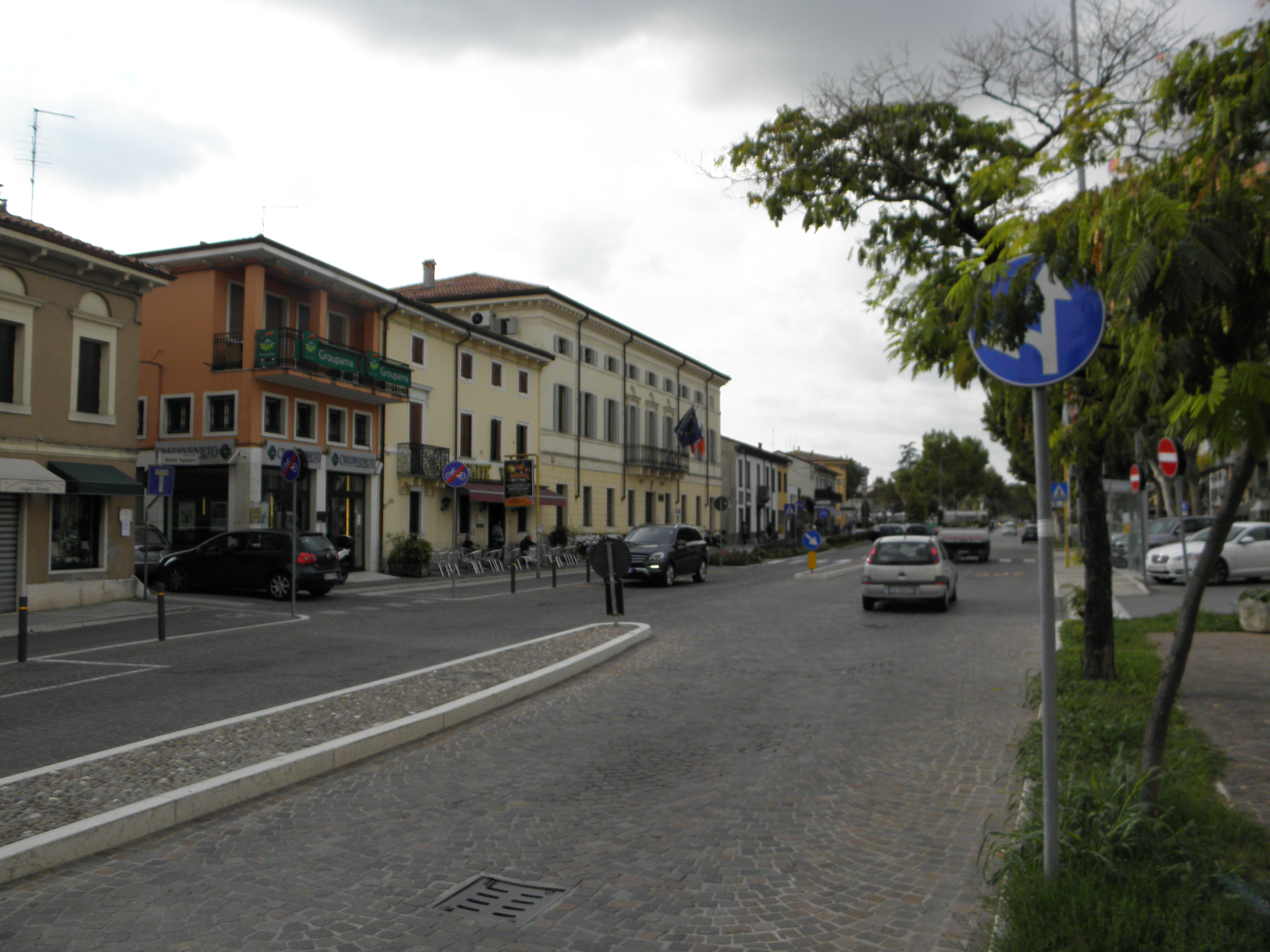

- Coat of arms

- Location within Italy Location within Veneto
- Coordinates: 45°23′N 11°2′E
- Country: Italy
- Region: Veneto
- Province: Verona (VR)
- Frazioni: Raldon, Pozzo, Camacici

Government
  - Mayor: Attilio Gastaldello

Area
  - Total: 18.9 km^{2} (7.3 sq mi)
- Elevation: 42 m (138 ft)

Population (1 December 2010)
  - Total: 25,016
  - Density: 1,320/km^{2} (3,430/sq mi)
- Demonym: Lupatotini
- Time zone: UTC+1 (CET)
  - Summer (DST): UTC+2 (CEST)
- Postal code: 37057, 37050
- Dialing code: 045
- Patron saint: St. John the Baptist
- Saint day: June 24
- Website: Official website

San Giovanni Lupatoto is a town and comune (municipality) in the Province of Verona in the Italian region Veneto, located about 100 kilometres (62 mi) west of Venice and about 7 kilometres (4 mi) southeast of Verona.

San Giovanni Lupatoto borders the following municipalities: Buttapietra, Oppeano, San Martino Buon Albergo, Verona and Zevio.

== Notable people ==
- Giovanni Battistoni, footballer
- Marco Marcelliano Marcello, 19th-century composer and writer
- Gastone Moschin, actor
- Bernardo Poli, footballer

== Twin towns ==
- Seyssinet-Pariset, France, since 1986
