= Salesio Pegrassi =

Italian sculptor (1812–1879)

Salesio Pegrassi (Verona, 12 November 1812 - 6 December 1879) was an Italian sculptor.

== Biography ==
He was born to humble family and a resident of Verona. Ha completed a large number of bas reliefs, funereal monuments, statuettes and other decorative work. His reliefs in stone of animals, birds, and plants were highly prized.

He first apprenticed under the painter Giovanni Caliari. From there studied at the Academy of Fine Arts in Verona. One of his first carvings was a Deposition from the Cross on an altar in a church of Legnago. He obtained many commission from abroad, including the patronage of William John Bankes. He sculpted a Virgin Mary for the facade of the church of Oppeano, and angel for the church of Valeggio sul Mincio.

He briefly forsook his Catholic faith for an evangelical faith. His obituary suggests that boredom and lack of fame and fortune led him on December 31, 1877, to jump in front of a train. He survived and returned to work, although the last two years were accompanied by physical pain. He had many a pupil in his native Verona.
