= Arroz à grega =

Brazilian rice dish

Arroz à grega (Portuguese pronunciation: [ɐˈʁoˌza ˈɡɾeɡɐ], "Greek-style rice") is a Brazilian dish, consisting of rice cooked with raisins and small pieces of vegetables, the most common of them small cubes of carrot, green peas, sweet corn and spring onions.

== Preparation ==
Arroz à grega is made with a high-starch, short grain rice of the same type that is used to make risotto. The rice is sautéed in olive oil with grated carrot, mashed garlic, onion and chopped green chilis. Some recipes also add tomatoes. Boiling water is added and after allowing the rice to simmer, peas are added and some margarine or butter. The rice is allowed to rest before serving. It can be served as a side for camarão à grega or fish.
