= Castel d'Azzano =

- Comune
- Comune di Castel d'Azzano
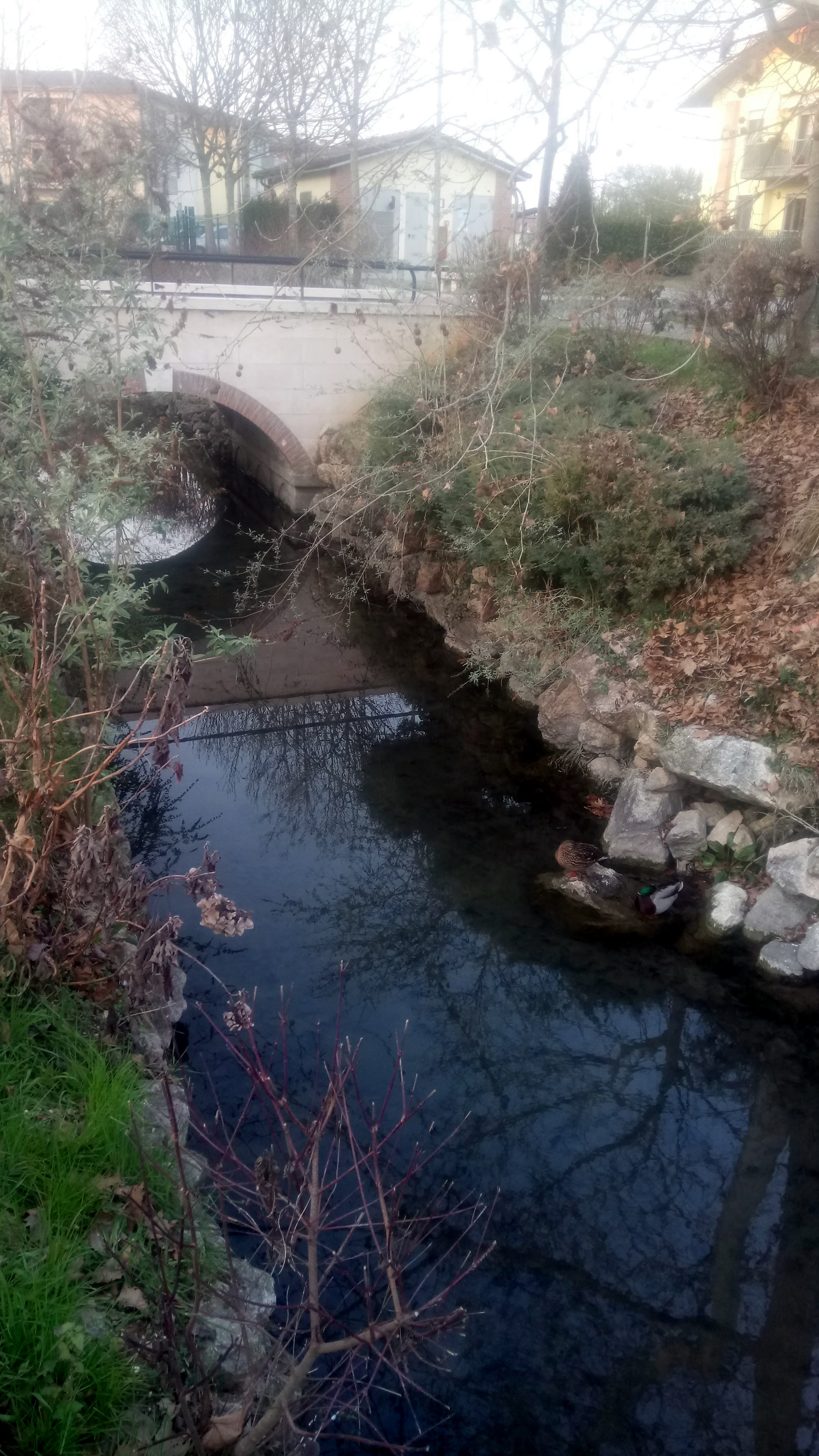
- Fosso Baiardina in Azzano

- Location within Italy Location within Veneto
- Coordinates: 45°21′N 10°57′E
- Country: Italy
- Region: Veneto
- Province: Province of Verona (VR)
- Frazioni: Rizza, San Martino, Forette

Government
  - Mayor: Elena Guadagnini (Lega/Civica)

Area
  - Total: 10.0 km^{2} (3.9 sq mi)
- Elevation: 50 m (160 ft)

Population (Sep. 2011)
  - Total: 11,865
  - Density: 1,190/km^{2} (3,070/sq mi)
- Demonym: Casteldazzanesi
- Time zone: UTC+1 (CET)
  - Summer (DST): UTC+2 (CEST)
- Postal code: 37060
- Dialing code: 045
- Website: Official website

Castel d'Azzano is a comune (municipality) in the Province of Verona in the Italian region Veneto, located about 110 km (68 mi) west of Venice and about 6 kilometres (4 miles) southwest of Verona. As of 1 September 2011, it had a population of 11.865 and an area of 10.0 square kilometres (3.9 sq mi).

The municipality of Castel d'Azzano contains the frazioni (subdivisions, mainly villages and hamlets) La Rizza, San Martino, and Forette.

Castel d'Azzano borders the following municipalities: Buttapietra, Verona, Vigasio, and Villafranca di Verona.

== History ==
On 14 October 2025, the deliberate explosion of the Ramponi family farmhouse killed three Carabinieri officers and injured 25 others people, including the man who triggered the gas explosion. The municipality proclaimed five days of mourning, the Veneto Region proclaimed a regional mourning day, and a national mourning day was instituted with a state funeral for the three Carabinieri. There also was a minute of silence held in all Italian schools on Friday 17 October.

== Demographic evolution ==
Historical population

| Year | Pop. | ±% |
|---|---|---|
| 1861 | ? | — |
| 1871 | 943 | — |
| 1881 | 1,028 | +9.0% |
| 1901 | 1,220 | +18.7% |
| 1911 | 1,400 | +14.8% |

| Year | Pop. | ±% |
|---|---|---|
| 1921 | 1,709 | +22.1% |
| 1931 | 2,269 | +32.8% |
| 1936 | 2,509 | +10.6% |
| 1951 | 2,893 | +15.3% |
| 1961 | 3,359 | +16.1% |

| Year | Pop. | ±% |
|---|---|---|
| 1971 | 4,299 | +28.0% |
| 1981 | 7,841 | +82.4% |
| 1991 | 9,329 | +19.0% |
| 2001 | 10,242 | +9.8% |

Source: Data from ISTAT

== See also ==
- 2025 Castel d'Azzano explosion
