= 2025 Castel d'Azzano explosion =

Suicide attack on law enforcement in Italy

- Location: Castel d'Azzano, Verona, Italy
- Date: 13–14 October 2025
- Target: Carabinieri and Italian State Police officers
- Attack type: Bombing
- Deaths: 3 Carabinieri
- Injuries: 27 (including the perpetrators)
- Perpetrators: Franco, Dino, and Maria Luisa Ramponi
- Motive: Retaliation for attempted eviction of the building

The Castel d'Azzano explosion was an attack perpetrated against Carabinieri and police officers who were evicting a farmhouse near Castel d'Azzano, Verona, Italy between 13 and 14 October 2025. The occupants filled the farmhouse with gas cylinders, and several incendiary devices before detonating the gas when the Carabinieri and Italian State Police arrived. Three Carabinieri officers were killed in the incident and 25 others people were injured including one of the perpetrators. It is the deadliest attack on Carabinieri officers since the 2003 Nasiriyah bombing.

== Background ==
The Ramponi family are rural family that lived near Castel d'Azzano, Verona. They were destitute, financially and economically bankrupt, and believed that an ongoing eviction from their farm, which they had been fighting for five years as the result of a foreclosure proceeding, was fraudulent. They did not want to leave the farmhouse and the nearby field, which provided the family with a livelihood. The Ramponi family had previously threatened to blow up the farmhouse the year before, in October and November 2024 following an attempted eviction from the property. Numerous attempts had been made against the Ramponi family to have them evicted from the premise, including one in which one of the family members had attempted to set himself on fire.

== The attack ==
The attack had been premeditated for years, with the intention of causing as much damage as possible and destroying the farmhouse. When the Carabinieri and Polizia di Stato arrived shortly before dawn to raid the premise with the aim of searching the house for explosives and Molotov cocktails, as ordered by the Verona Prosecutor's Office, following threats made against them and the finding two intact Molotov cocktails on the roof of the house and several gas cylinders. The farmhouse was completely saturated with gas from gas cylinders and incendiary devices by the time they surrounded the building. As officers reached a door the gas was detonate, killing three Carabinieri officers and injuring 25 others persons, including the perpetrator, Maria Luisa Ramponi. Maria had physically triggered the detonation of the farmhouse with lit Molotov cocktails, which ignited the gas. While the two brothers were hiding nearby, Dino Ramponi was immediately arrested, while Franco Ramponi, who was attempting to escape, was tracked down in the surrounding fields during the morning and arrested. The family was in dire financial and economic straits, and the year before, the sister had publicly declared, in opposing the eviction of the farmhouse, that she had deliberately saturated the farmhouse with the gas.

== Victims ==
The following three Carabinieri officers killed were:

- Brigadiere Capo Valerio Daprà, 56,
- Carabiniere Scelto Davide Bernardello, 36,
- Luogotenente Marco Piffari, 56.

Another 13 members of the Carabinieri were injured, out of a total of 25 people injured. The other 12 injured were Italian state police, and firefighters, along with the perpetrator, Maria Luisa Ramponi.

== Aftermath ==
Maria Luisa Ramponi should have received compulsory medical treatment for the suicide attempt she had carried out the previous year, in November 2024, together with her brothers. The explosion or bombing highlighted shortcomings or failings in the social and healthcare systems, as well as an underestimation of the risk by the law enforcement personnel who rushed to clear the building. The family Ramponi had been reported, but they had not received adequate support from social services. Furthermore, their danger had been considered in light of previous incidents and large numbers of law enforcement and firefighters responded precisely, but the risk was underestimated.

=== State Funeral ===
The state funeral was held in the Basilica of Santa Giustina in Padua for the three Carabinieri killed in the explosion. The ceremony was attended by President of Italy Sergio Mattarella, who was moved when he met with the victims' families shortly before the funeral began. Prime Minister of Italy Giorgia Meloni, Senate President Ignazio La Russa, Chamber President Lorenzo Fontana, and several ministers, including Antonio Tajani, Guido Crosetto, Matteo Salvini, Carlo Nordio and Matteo Piantedosi, as well as hundreds of law enforcement officials and many citizens.

== Reactions ==
The Italian Council of Ministers approved a state funeral and a period of national mourning for the three Carabinieri officers. The Veneto Region declared a day of mourning, and the Municipality of Castel d'Azzano declared six days of mourning.

Italian President Sergio Mattarella declared:"In questa drammatica circostanza, esprimo la mia solidale vicinanza all'Arma dei Carabinieri e sentimenti di partecipe cordoglio ai familiari, insieme all'augurio di pronta guarigione agli operatori feriti".

Prime Minister Giorgia Meloni declared: "Seguo con partecipazione e dolore gli sviluppi di questa drammatica vicenda, che ci richiama ancora una volta al valore e al sacrificio quotidiano di chi serve lo Stato e i suoi cittadini".

== See also ==
- List of massacres in Italy
