= Giovanni Battistoni =

Italian footballer (1910–1978)

Personal information
- Date of birth: 7 January 1910
- Place of birth: San Giovanni Lupatoto, Italy
- Date of death: 10 January 1978 (aged 68)
- Height: 1.70 m (5 ft 7 in)
- Position: Midfielder

Senior career*
| Years | Team | Apps | (Gls) |
| 1919–1931 | San Giovanni Lupatoto | | |
| 1931–1934 | Padova | 88 | (0) |
| 1934–1935 | Ambrosiana-Inter | 4 | (0) |
| 1935–1936 | Bari | 28 | (0) |
| 1936–1937 | Sampierdarenese | 26 | (1) |
| 1937–1939 | Liguria | 40 | (0) |
| 1939–1941 | Genova 1893 | 14 | (0) |
| 1941–1942 | Mantova | 6 | (0) |

International career
| 1939 | Italy | 2 | (0) |
- * Club domestic league appearances and goals

Giovanni Battistoni (Italian pronunciation: [dʒoˈvanni battiˈstoːni]; 7 January 1910 – 10 January 1978) was an Italian footballer who played as a midfielder.
