= Buttapietra =

- Comune
- Comune di Buttapietra
- Location within Italy Location within Veneto
- Coordinates: 45°21′N 10°56′E
- Country: Italy
- Region: Veneto
- Province: Province of Verona (VR)
- Frazioni: Bovo, Marchesino, Magnano e Settimo Gallese

Area
  - Total: 17.2 km^{2} (6.6 sq mi)
- Elevation: 38 m (125 ft)

Population (Dec. 2004)
  - Total: 6,195
  - Density: 360/km^{2} (933/sq mi)
- Demonym: Buttapietrini
- Time zone: UTC+1 (CET)
  - Summer (DST): UTC+2 (CEST)
- Postal code: 37060
- Dialing code: 045
- Website: Official website

Buttapietra is a comune (municipality) in the Province of Verona in the Italian region Veneto, located about 110 kilometres (68 mi) west of Venice and about 10 kilometres (6 mi) southwest of Verona. As of 31 December 2004, it had a population of 6,195 and an area of 17.2 square kilometres (6.6 mi^{2}).

The municipality of Buttapietra contains the frazioni (subdivisions, mainly villages and hamlets) Bovo and Marchesino e Settimo Gallese.

Buttapietra borders the following municipalities: Castel d'Azzano, Isola della Scala, Oppeano, San Giovanni Lupatoto, Verona, and Vigasio.

== Demographic evolution ==
Historical population

Year	Pop.	±%
1861	?	—
1871	1,322	—
1881	1,451	+9.8%
1901	1,471	+1.4%
1911	1,742	+18.4%

Year	Pop.	±%
1921	2,159	+23.9%
1931	2,612	+21.0%
1936	2,734	+4.7%
1951	3,447	+26.1%
1961	3,345	−3.0%

Year	Pop.	±%
1971	3,389	+1.3%
1981	4,018	+18.6%
1991	4,445	+10.6%
2001	5,801	+30.5%

Source: Data from ISTAT

== Twin towns ==
Buttapietra is twinned with:

- Bisenti, Italy
