= Isola della Scala =

- Comune
- Comune di Isola della Scala
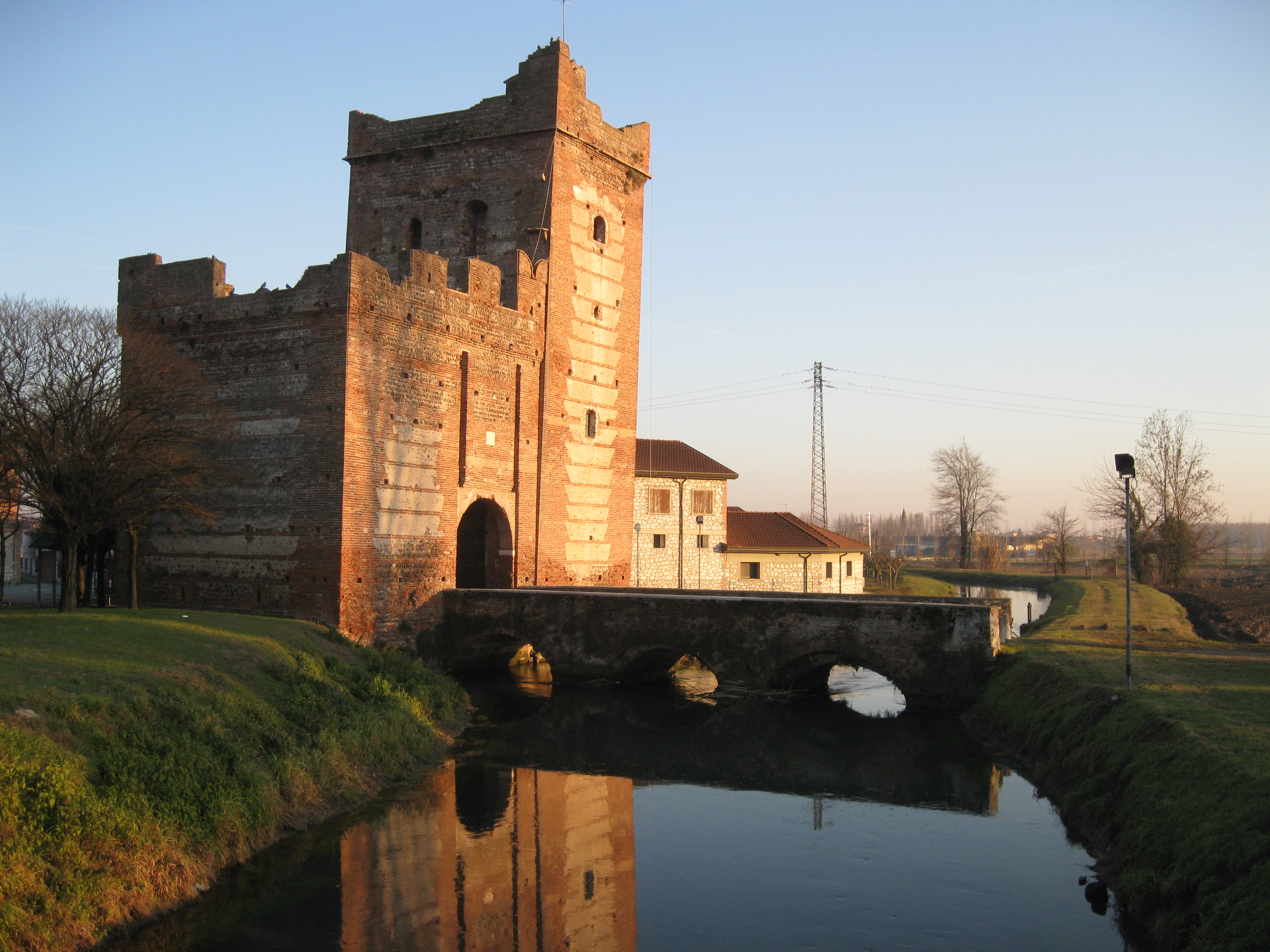

- Location within Italy Location within Veneto
- Coordinates: 45°16′N 11°8′E
- Country: Italy
- Region: Veneto
- Province: Verona (VR)
- Frazioni: Brognoligo, Caselle, Gabbia, Pellegrina, Tarmassia, Villafontana, Vo' Pindemonte

Government
  - Mayor: Stefano Canazza

Area
  - Total: 69.9 km^{2} (27.0 sq mi)
- Elevation: 31 m (102 ft)

Population (1 December 2014)
  - Total: 11,577
  - Density: 166/km^{2} (429/sq mi)
- Demonym: Isolani
- Time zone: UTC+1 (CET)
  - Summer (DST): UTC+2 (CEST)
- Postal code: 37063
- Dialing code: 045
- Patron saint: St. James
- Saint day: July 25
- Website: Official website

Isola della Scala is a comune (municipality) of c. 11463 inhabitants in the Province of Verona in the Italian region of Veneto, located about 90 kilometres (56 mi) west of Venice and about 20 kilometres (12 mi) southeast of Verona.

Isola della Scala borders the following municipalities: Bovolone, Buttapietra, Erbè, Nogara, Oppeano, Salizzole, Trevenzuolo, and Vigasio.

== Twin towns ==
- Eaubonne, France
- Budenheim, Germany

== Born ==
- Eros Poli (6 August 1963), cyclist
- Nicola Minali (10 November 1969), cyclist
- Alberto Pomini (17 March 1981), footballer
- Riccardo Meggiorini (4 September 1985), footballer
- Elia Viviani (7 February 1989), cyclist
- Michele Scartezzini (10 January 1992), cyclist
