= Bovolone =

- Comune
- Città di Bovolone
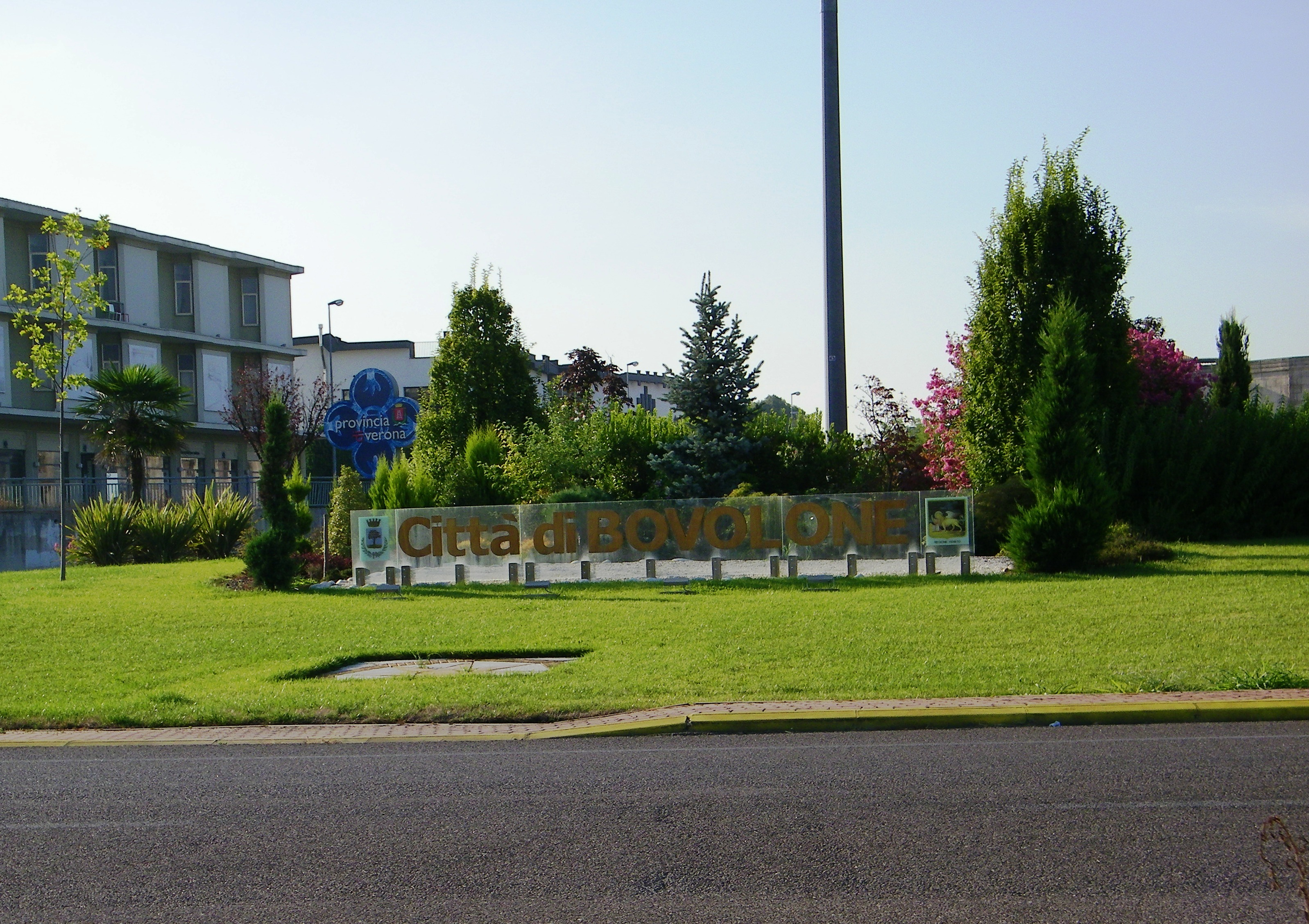

- Coat of arms

- Location within Italy Location within Veneto
- Coordinates: 45°15′N 11°8′E
- Country: Italy
- Region: Veneto
- Province: Verona (VR)
- Frazioni: Villafontana

Government
  - Mayor: Emilietto Mirandola (PdL)

Area
  - Total: 41.4 km^{2} (16.0 sq mi)
- Elevation: 24 m (79 ft)

Population (1 March 2016)
  - Total: 16,573
  - Density: 400/km^{2} (1,040/sq mi)
- Demonym: Bovolonesi
- Time zone: UTC+1 (CET)
  - Summer (DST): UTC+2 (CEST)
- Postal code: 37051, 37050 frazioni
- Dialing code: 045
- Website: Official website

Bovolone is a town and a comune (municipality) in the Province of Verona in the Italian region Veneto, located about 90 kilometres (56 mi) west of Venice and about 25 kilometres (16 mi) southeast of Verona.

Bovolone borders the following municipalities: Cerea, Concamarise, Isola della Scala, Isola Rizza, Oppeano, Salizzole, and San Pietro di Morubio.

== Notabable people ==
- Rino Passigato, Archbishop of the Catholic Church, who was the Apostolic Nuncio from 1991 to 2008.

== Twin towns ==
- Stadecken-Elsheim, Germany, since 2000
- Sinnai, Italy, since 2002
