= Riz Casimir =

Swiss curry dish with fruits

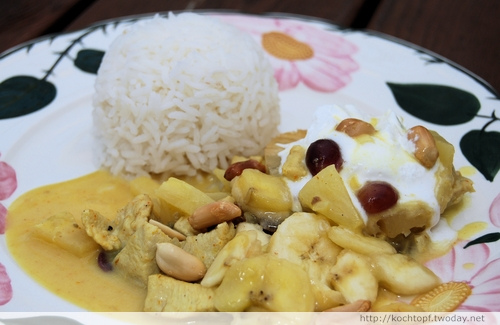
A dish of Riz Casimir

Riz Casimir (from French, sometimes Casimir Rice) is a curry dish originating in Switzerland. It is made from rice, sliced veal, curry sauce, and fruits, usually bananas, pineapples and peaches or cherries. It is also garnished with roasted almond slivers. Long-grain rice is normally used for Riz Casimir. Veal is often replaced with pork or chicken. Other fruits may also be used.

Riz Casimir was introduced by the Mövenpick company; it has been on the menu in the Mövenpick restaurants since 1952. Ueli Prager, the founder of Mövenpick, is generally credited for the creation of the dish. It was soon promoted in Swiss cookbooks, by Elisabeth Fülscher from 1960 and by Betty Bossi from 1968. According to historian Roger Sidler, this is a dish that reflects the increasing need for exoticism in post-war Switzerland. Casimir is perhaps derived from Kashmir, as cultural historian Petra Foede suggested, the dish being inspired by Indian cuisine.

Riz Casimir quickly became a popular dish in Switzerland, especially as a family dish. The Hero Cannery marketed canned fruits for Riz Casimir and the dish was also served in the army. Its popularity declined, however, by the end of the 20th century.

== See also ==
- Risotto alla ticinese, another rice dish from Switzerland
- Swiss cuisine
