= Vigasio =

- Comune
- Comune di Vigasio
- Location within Italy Location within Veneto
- Coordinates: 45°19′N 10°56′E
- Country: Italy
- Region: Veneto
- Province: Province of Verona (VR)
- Frazioni: Isolalta, Forette

Area
  - Total: 30.8 km^{2} (11.9 sq mi)
- Elevation: 37 m (121 ft)

Population (Dec. 2004)
  - Total: 7,393
  - Density: 240/km^{2} (622/sq mi)
- Demonym: Vigasiani
- Time zone: UTC+1 (CET)
  - Summer (DST): UTC+2 (CEST)
- Postal code: 37068
- Dialing code: 045
- Website: Official website

Vigasio is a comune (municipality) in the Province of Verona in the Italian region Veneto, located about 110 kilometres (68 mi) west of Venice and about 14 kilometres (9 mi) southwest of Verona. As of 31 December 2004, it had a population of 7,393 and an area of 30.8 square kilometres (11.9 mi^{2}).

The municipality of Vigasio contains the frazioni (subdivisions, mainly villages and hamlets) Isolalta and Forette.

Vigasio borders the following municipalities: Buttapietra, Castel d'Azzano, Isola della Scala, Nogarole Rocca, Povegliano Veronese, Trevenzuolo, and Villafranca di Verona.

Composer Italo Montemezzi was a native of Vigasio.

== Demographic evolution ==
Historical population

Year	Pop.	±%
1861	?	—
1871	2,289	—
1881	2,430	+6.2%
1901	2,579	+6.1%
1911	3,092	+19.9%

Year	Pop.	±%
1921	3,811	+23.3%
1931	4,200	+10.2%
1936	4,201	+0.0%
1951	4,876	+16.1%
1961	5,003	+2.6%

Year	Pop.	±%
1971	4,854	−3.0%
1981	5,463	+12.5%
1991	6,050	+10.7%
2001	6,798	+12.4%

Source: Data from ISTAT
