= Concamarise =

- Comune
- Comune di Concamarise
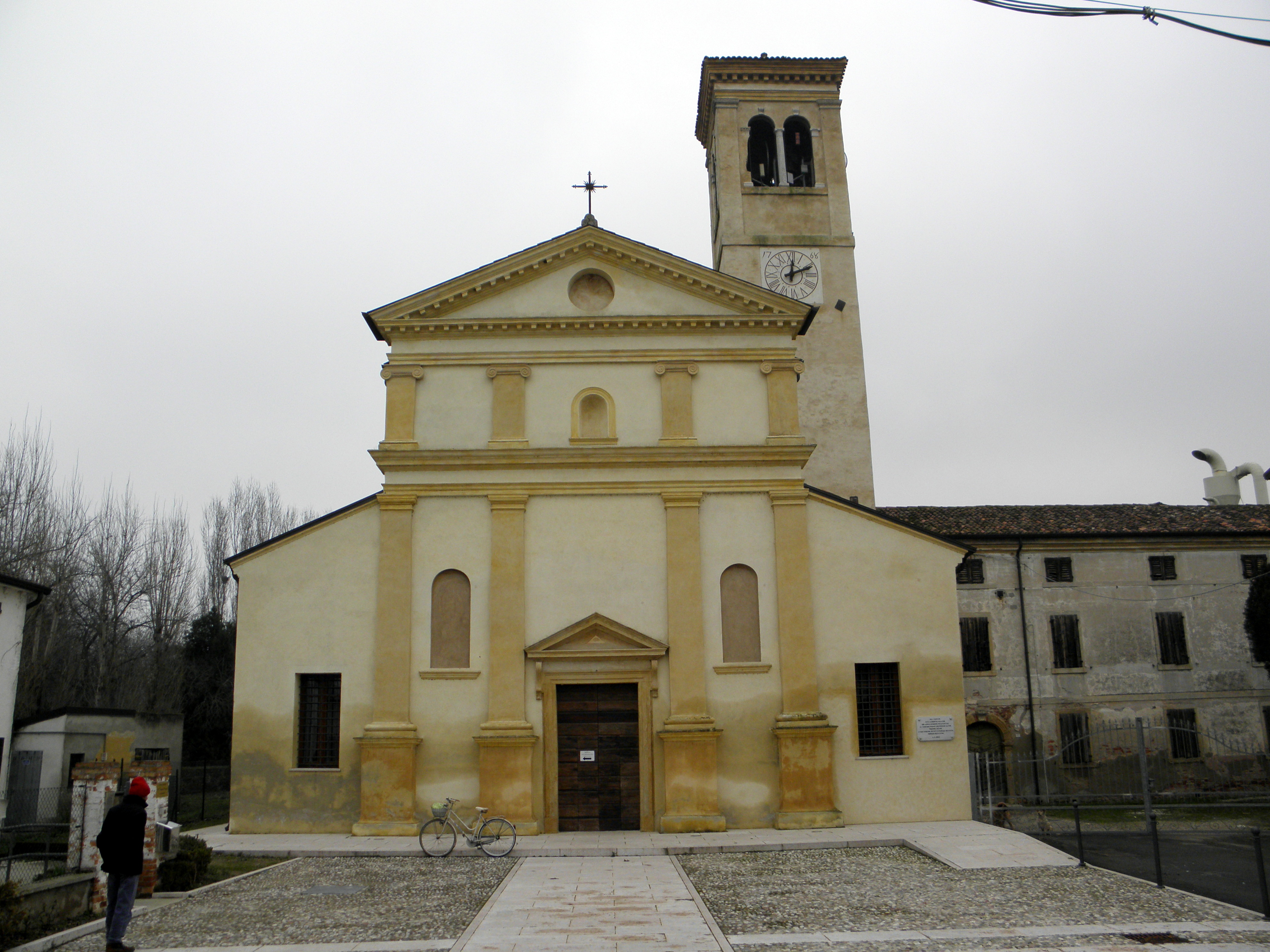
- Santi Lorenzo e Stefano church

- Location within Italy Location within Veneto
- Coordinates: 45°12′N 11°8′E
- Country: Italy
- Region: Veneto
- Province: Province of Verona (VR)
- Frazioni: Capitello

Area
  - Total: 7.9 km^{2} (3.1 sq mi)
- Elevation: 20 m (66 ft)

Population (Dec. 2004)
  - Total: 1,044
  - Density: 130/km^{2} (340/sq mi)
- Demonym: Concamarisini
- Time zone: UTC+1 (CET)
  - Summer (DST): UTC+2 (CEST)
- Postal code: 37050
- Dialing code: 0442

Concamarise is a comune (municipality) in the Province of Verona in the Italian region Veneto, located about 100 kilometres (62 mi) southwest of Venice and about 30 kilometres (19 mi) southeast of Verona. As of 31 December 2004, it had a population of 1,044 and an area of 7.9 square kilometres (3.1 mi^{2}).

The municipality of Concamarise contains the frazione (subdivision) Capitello.

Concamarise borders the following municipalities: Bovolone, Cerea, Salizzole, and Sanguinetto.

== Demographic evolution ==
Historical population

Year	Pop.	±%
1861	?	—
1871	955	—
1881	980	+2.6%
1901	1,041	+6.2%
1911	1,068	+2.6%

Year	Pop.	±%
1921	1,194	+11.8%
1931	1,118	−6.4%
1936	1,216	+8.8%
1951	1,295	+6.5%
1961	1,252	−3.3%

Year	Pop.	±%
1971	1,092	−12.8%
1981	1,098	+0.5%
1991	1,078	−1.8%
2001	1,064	−1.3%

Source: Data from ISTAT
