= Salizzole =

- Comune
- Comune di Salizzole
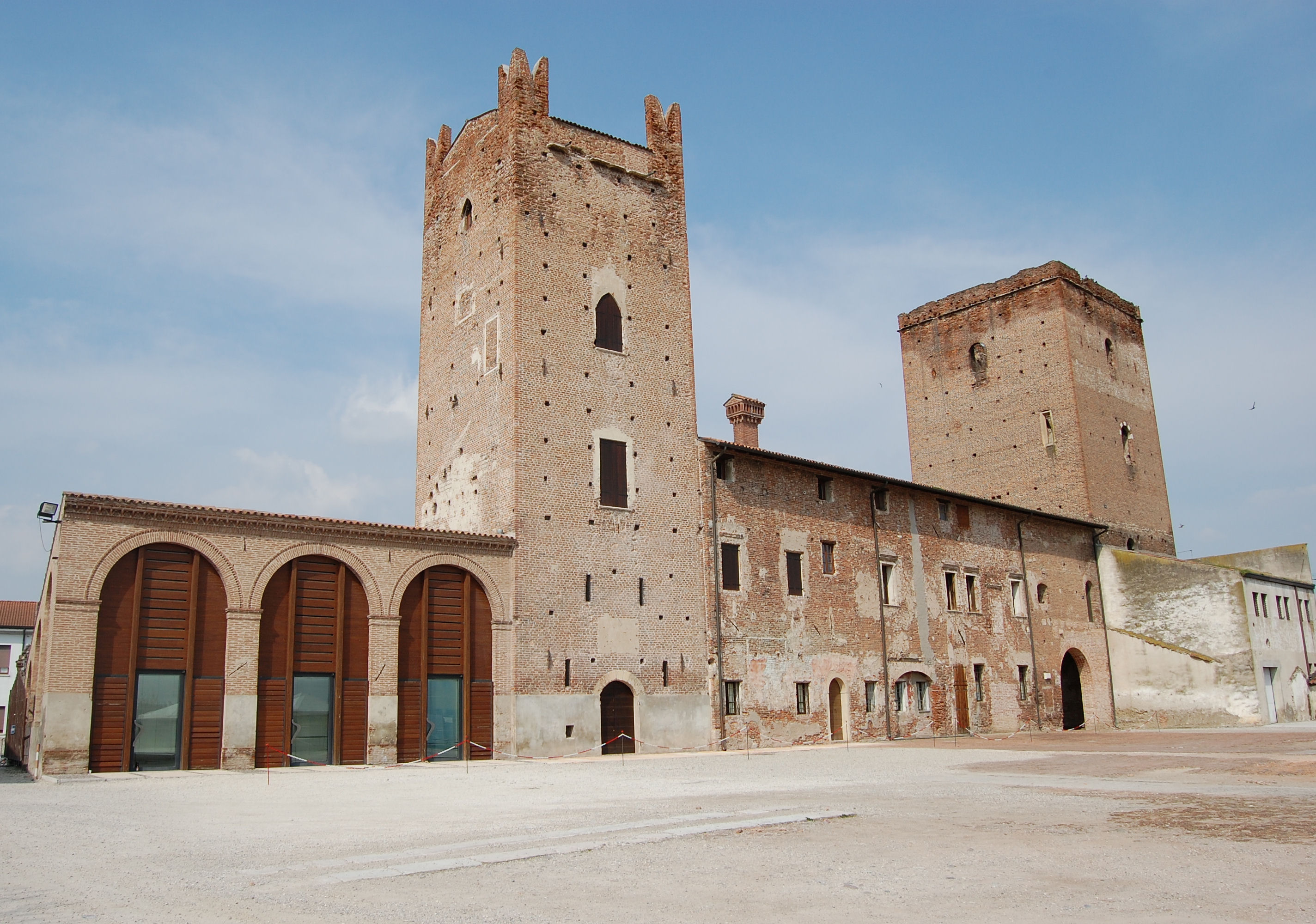
- Scaliger Castle.

- Coat of arms

- Location within Italy Location within Veneto
- Coordinates: 45°15′N 11°5′E
- Country: Italy
- Region: Veneto
- Province: Verona (VR)
- Frazioni: Bionde, Engazzà e Valmorsel

Government
  - Mayor: Mirko Corrà

Area
  - Total: 30.65 km^{2} (11.83 sq mi)
- Elevation: 22 m (72 ft)

Population (1 December 2010)
  - Total: 3,750
  - Density: 122/km^{2} (317/sq mi)
- Demonym: Salizzolesi
- Time zone: UTC+1 (CET)
  - Summer (DST): UTC+2 (CEST)
- Postal code: 37056
- Dialing code: 045
- Patron saint: Saint Martin
- Saint day: November 11
- Website: Official website

Salizzole is a comune (municipality) in the Province of Verona in the Italian region Veneto, located about 100 kilometres (62 mi) west of Venice and about 20 kilometres (12 mi) southeast of Verona. Economy includes production of rice and of artistic furniture.

Salizzole borders the following municipalities: Bovolone, Concamarise, Isola della Scala, Nogara, and Sanguinetto.

== Main sights ==
=== Churches ===
- Santa Maria Assunta (15th century)
- S. Caterina di Alessandria (15th century)
- S.Martino (16th century)

=== Villas ===
- Corte Busa (15th century)
- Villa Sagramoso-Campostrini-Malafatti (16th century)
- Villa Zanetti (16th century)
- Villa Franceschini (16th century)
- Villa Pullè (17th century)

=== Fortifications ===
- Castle (12th century). It was the residence of the family of Cangrande della Scala's mother.
