= Sanguinetto =

- Comune
- Comune di Sanguinetto
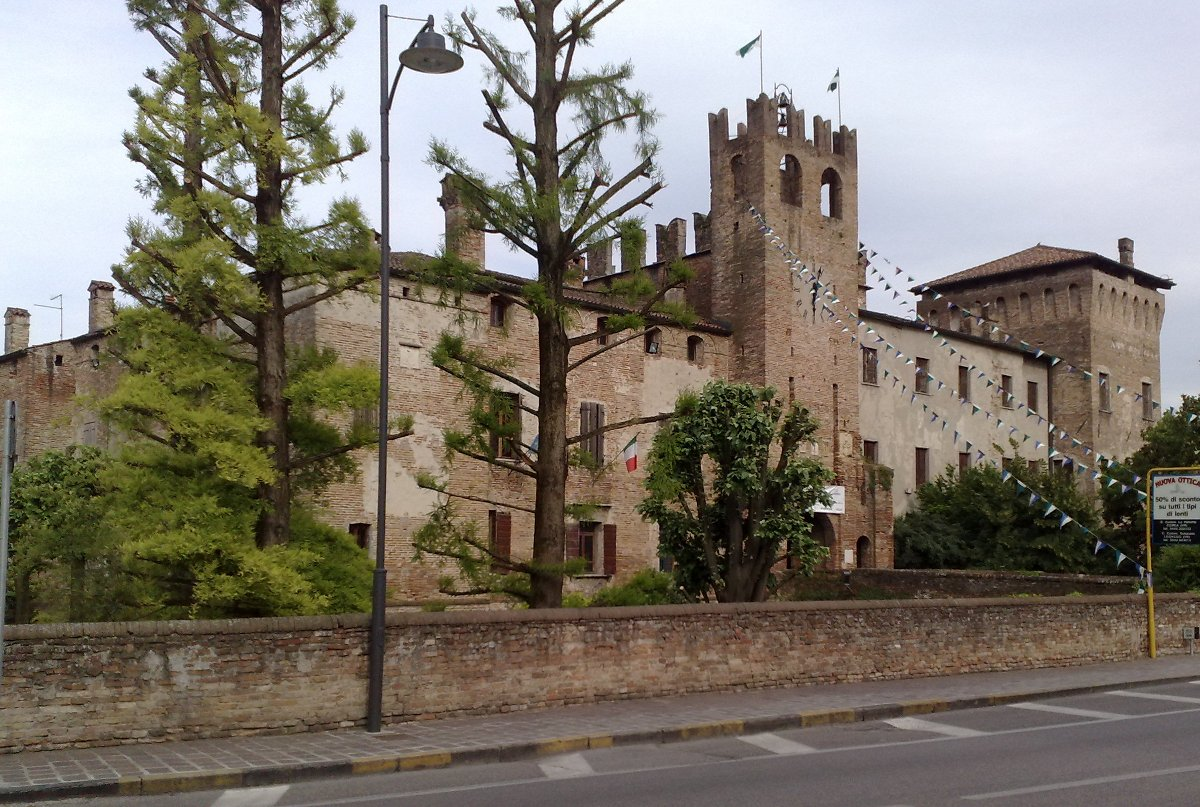

- Location within Italy Location within Veneto
- Coordinates: 45°11′N 11°9′E
- Country: Italy
- Region: Veneto
- Province: Province of Verona (VR)
- Frazioni: Venera

Area
  - Total: 13.6 km^{2} (5.3 sq mi)
- Elevation: 19 m (62 ft)

Population (Dec. 2004)
  - Total: 4,009
  - Density: 295/km^{2} (763/sq mi)
- Demonym: Sanguinettani
- Time zone: UTC+1 (CET)
  - Summer (DST): UTC+2 (CEST)
- Postal code: 37058
- Dialing code: 0442
- Website: Official website

Sanguinetto is a comune (municipality) in the Province of Verona in the Italian region Veneto, located about 100 kilometres (62 mi) southwest of Venice and about 30 kilometres (19 mi) southeast of Verona. As of 31 December 2004, it had a population of 4,009 and an area of 13.6 square kilometres (5.3 mi^{2}).

The municipality of Sanguinetto contains the frazione (subdivision) Venera.

Sanguinetto borders the following municipalities: Casaleone, Cerea, Concamarise, Gazzo Veronese, Nogara, and Salizzole.

== Demographic evolution ==
Historical population

Year	Pop.	±%
1861	?	—
1871	2,664	—
1881	2,924	+9.8%
1901	3,021	+3.3%
1911	2,780	−8.0%

Year	Pop.	±%
1921	3,060	+10.1%
1931	3,239	+5.8%
1936	3,471	+7.2%
1951	3,777	+8.8%
1961	3,591	−4.9%

Year	Pop.	±%
1971	4,144	+15.4%
1981	4,419	+6.6%
1991	4,205	−4.8%
2001	3,998	−4.9%

Source: Data from ISTAT
