= Dairy farming in Italy =

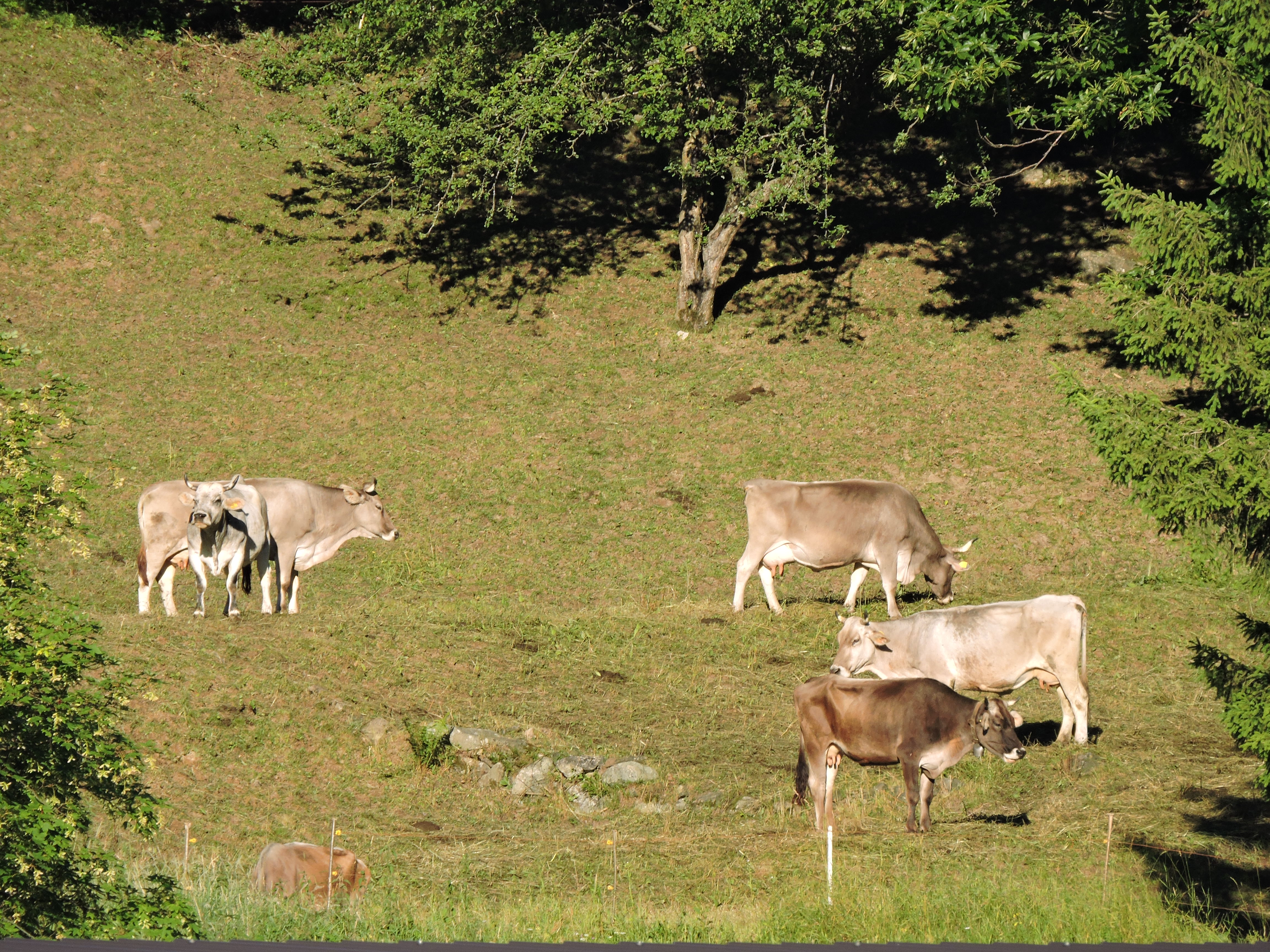
A dairy farm in Esino Laurio, Province of Lecco

Dairy farming in Italy is an important industry, both for domestic consumption and for exports. Two of the most well-known ranges of dairy products are gelato (ice cream) and a wide variety of cheeses, of which many have Protected Designation of Origin under EU law.

== Major companies ==
Some of the largest companies in the Italian dairy sector are Parmalat, Auricchio, Cielo (company), Gelati Cecchi, and Sterilgarda.

== Workforce ==
The production of quintessentially Italian cheeses such as Parmigiano-Reggiano, Grana Padano, and mozzarella, depends significantly on immigrant labour. Starting in the 1990s, Indians have come to dominate the labour force of the Italian dairy industry in a surprising niche market.

Statistics show that most Indians in Italy tend to settle in the north of the country and work in agriculture. The Po Valley is similar in climate to the Punjab, where most of these Sikh workers are from. Their first jobs tend to be directly with the cows and buffalos, as many come from farming families, but some move on to become cheesemakers, which is better paying.

it:Coldiretti, which Politico Europe describes as Italy's most important farming union, and civic authorities in the region acknowledge that the immigrants are indispensable for agriculture in general and the dairy industry in particular. The dairy workers themselves (bergamini) tend to belong to the Italian General Confederation of Labour.
