= Maratelli =

Rice cultivar

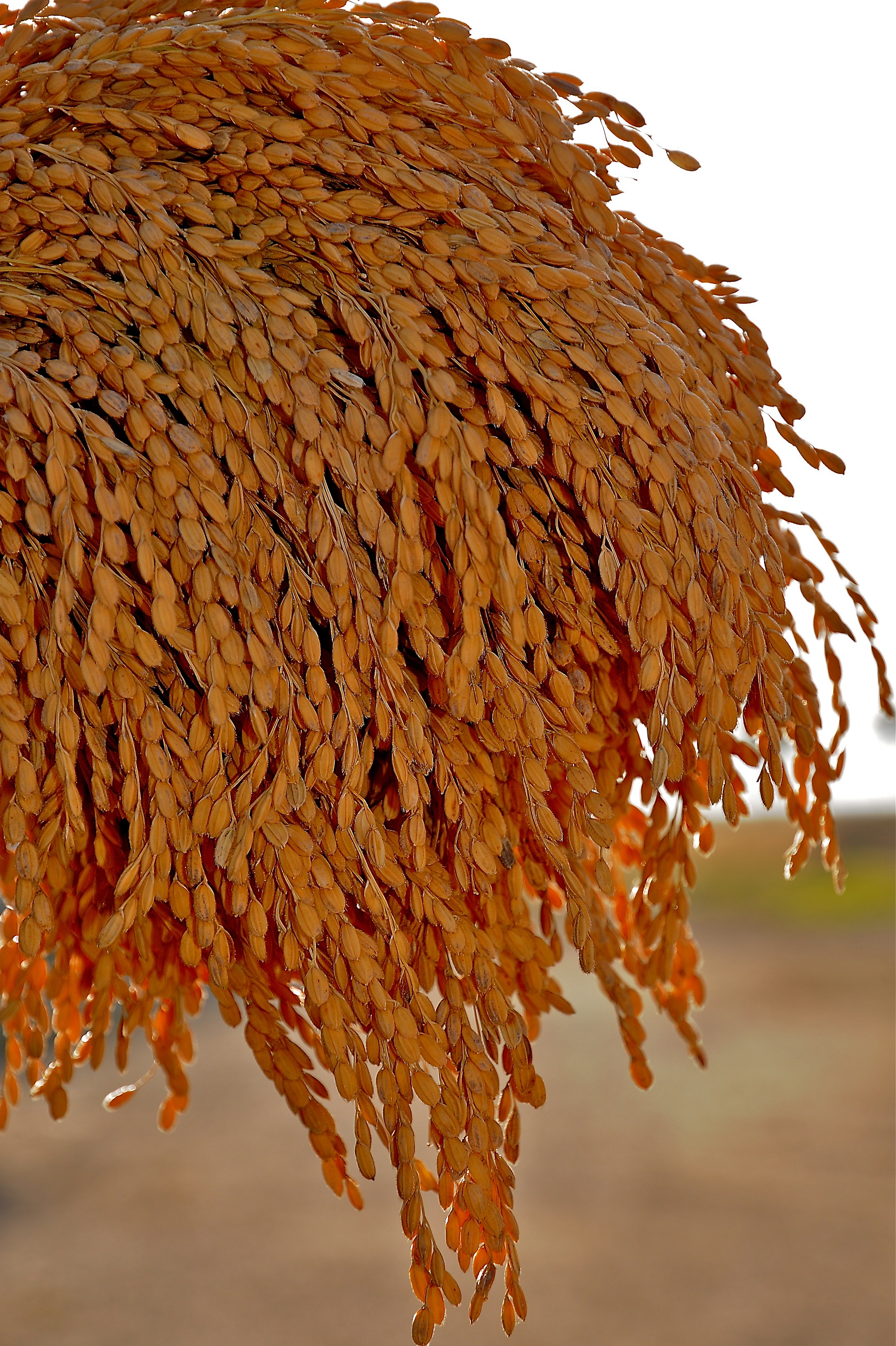
Maratelli

Maratelli is a semifino rice native to the comune (municipality) of Asigliano Vercellese, in the province of Vercelli, Italy. Compared to other Japonica varieties, it is early-ripening, it has a good yield and, in the right weather conditions, allows for the early use of fields for other successive cultivation. It is a stable rice genotype, hence maintaining constant culinary and botanical properties over time.

Maratelli rice keeps its shape better than other forms of rice during slow cooking. Due to higher quantities of amylose it is perfect for making risotto. Chef Gualtiero Marchesi used it in its original "Risotto oro e zafferano" recipe in 1982.

== History ==
In 1914, Mario Maratelli used to grow the "Chinese Originario" native variety. While weeding, he noticed that one plant was taller than all the others with a yellow grain, as if to indicate an advanced ripeness. He then decided to isolate and observe it. He collected its grains and seeded them in a small area the following year. Finally, he could study its vegetative cycle. Thus, Maratelli discovered a new variety derived from a natural hybrid of the then-widespread Chinese genus Japonica.

In the 1960s and 70s, it reached its peak of culinary popularity and widespread cultivation. Martelli rice saw a constant increase in its cultivation and reached its real boom in 1969 and 1970 with more than 13,000 hectares dedicated to its cultivation. In 1970 it covered 8% of Italian rice-cultivated fields. Soon after, it experienced a drastic decline (in 1973 only 800 hectares were planted), and then it had completely disappeared by 1982. The arrival of new, more productive varieties and poor wind resistance in the fields forced it to exit the markets.

Thanks to the hard work of one local rice grower, in 1992 an organic Maratelli rice cultivation was re-launched. At the beginning of 2013, the variety was listed in the National Register of Historic Varieties, and others began its cultivation.

== Certifications ==
- PAT Piedmont
- Slow Food "Ark of taste"

== Cooking properties and uses ==
Its grain is famous for its excellent flavour-absorbing properties and bite after cooking. Since it does not overcook it has been a go-to for home cooks and chefs. The grains of white rice are traditionally used to prepare classic dishes, such as rice soups or risotto's regional variations like "panissa vercellese" and "paniscia novarese".

Its spread around Europe comported various uses in savoury and sweet dishes. In Rome, it is appreciated for supplì, and in Sicily for arancine. Also used in sweets such as rice porridge, pudding or Tuscan budino di riso.

== Cultural Association ==
The "Riso Maratelli 1914" cultural association was founded in Asigliano Vercellese in 2012. It deals with maintaining the historical memory of the rice variety.

== Botanical and agronomic traits ==
Maratelli is an historical variety of Italian rice production, developed in 1919 through the selection of Chinese originario by Mario Maratelli from Asigliano. "Maratelli" is a semi-early variety (15 days earlier than Chinese originario) which shows a medium height and a semifino, awnless pearl grain. Maratelli shows a high seedling vegetative vigor, quite a good tiller index (seven fertile stems/plant), good cold tolerance at germination stage, and medium cold tolerance at flowering stage. Stem has average height of 90–110 cm, strong and resistant to lodging. Leaf is light green colour.

- Panicle: open, semi droopy attitude.
- Average length 20 cm, with 90–110 kernels per panicle.
- Spikelet: yellow colour, pigmented point and awnless.
- Spikelet biometric data: 7.8 mm length and 3.7 mm width.
- 1000-kernel weight is 32.2 grams
- Kernels: white pericarp, pearl endosperm (lateral pearl and irregular shape).
- Kernel biometric data: 5.6 mm length and 3.2 mm width.
- 1000-kernel weight is 24.1 grams
