= Arborio rice =

Italian rice variety

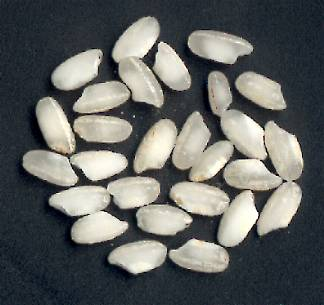
Arborio rice grains

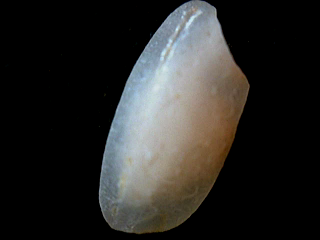
A macro photo of an Arborio rice grain

Arborio rice is an Italian medium-grain rice. It is named after the comune (municipality) of Arborio, in the Po Valley, which is situated in the Piedmont region. When cooked, the rounded grains are firm, creamy and chewy compared to other varieties of rice, due to their higher amylopectin starch content. It has a starchy taste and blends well with other flavours. Arborio rice is often used to make risotto; other suitable varieties include Carnaroli, Maratelli, Baldo, and Vialone Nano. Arborio rice is also usually used for rice pudding.

Arborio is a cultivar of the Japonica group of varieties of Oryza sativa.

== See also ==
Media related to Arborio rice at Wikimedia Commons

- Carnaroli
- Vialone Nano
