= Carnaroli =

Italian rice variety

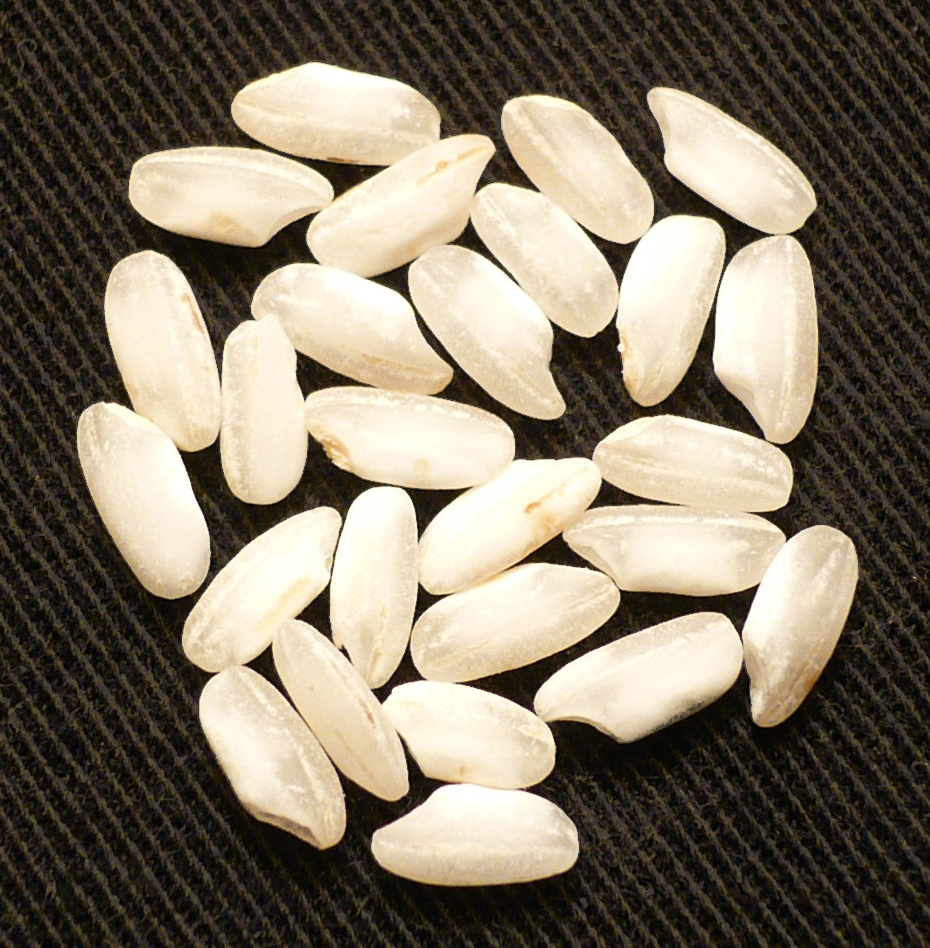
Grains of dried Carnaroli rice

Carnaroli is an Italian medium-grained rice grown in the Pavia, Novara, and Vercelli provinces of northern Italy. Carnaroli is used for making risotto, differing from the more common arborio rice due to its higher starch content and firmer texture, as well as having a longer grain. Carnaroli rice keeps its shape better than other forms of rice during the slow cooking required for making risotto due to its higher amylose content. It is the most widely used rice in Italian cuisine, and is highly prized.

== History ==
The history of Carnaroli is not well defined, the sources date its birth to 1945 thanks to the crossing between Vialone and Lencino, following the numerous attempts made in various provinces. This variety was named after Professor Emiliano Carnaroli, President of the "Ente Nazionale Risi" (National Rice Body) at that time.

The first registration of the Carnaroli variety in the Varietal Register is from 1974 and the responsibility for the conservation in purity was entrusted to Achille De Vecchi. In 1983, after the conservation tasks were passed to the "Ente Nazionale Risi", it was re-registered in the national register and the person responsible for conservation in purity became the National Organism itself.

It is often described as a superfino rice or as "the king of rices".

== See also ==
- Arborio
- Vialone Nano
