= Risotto =

Northern Italian rice dish

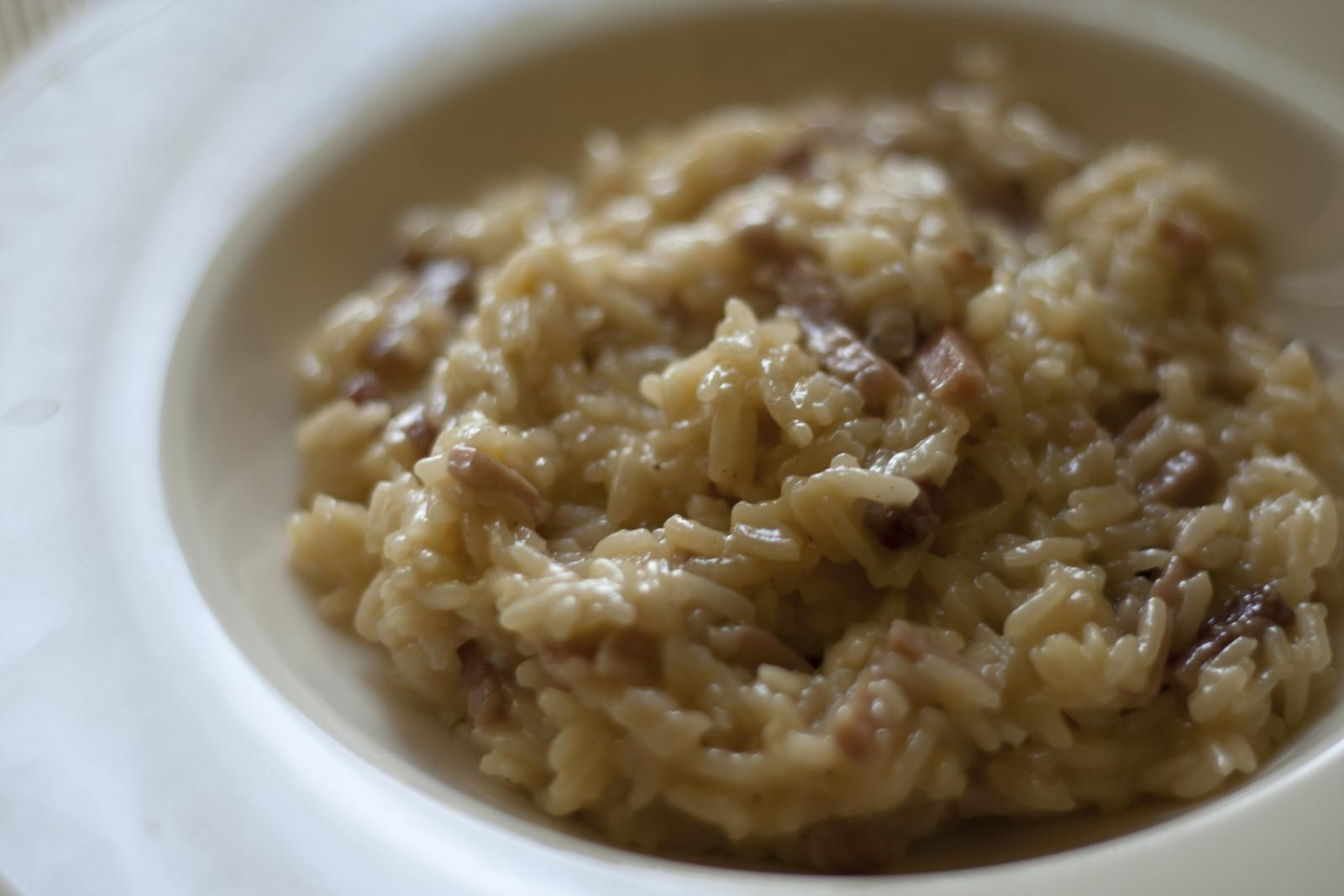
- Risotto with speck and goat cheese
- Course: Primo (Italian course)
- Place of origin: Italy
- Region or state: Lombardy; Piedmont; Veneto
- Main ingredients: Arborio rice, broth, butter, onion, white wine, Parmesan

Risotto (/rɪˈzɒtoʊ/, /-ˈzoʊt-/ riz-OT-oh, Italian: [riˈzɔtto, -ˈsɔt-]; from riso, 'rice') (Note: Lombard: risòtt; Piedmontese: risòt; Venetian: rixoto.) is an Italian rice dish cooked with broth until it reaches a creamy consistency. The broth can be derived from meat, fish or vegetables. Many types of risotto contain butter, onion, white wine, and Parmesan cheese. It is one of the most common ways of cooking rice in Italy. Saffron was originally used for flavour and its signature yellow colour.

Risotto in Italy is usually a first course (primo), served before a second course (secondo), but risotto alla milanese is often served with ossobuco alla milanese as a one-course meal.

== History ==
Rice has been grown in southern Italy for centuries, and gradually made its way to northern Italy, where the marshes of the Po Valley were suitable for rice cultivation. According to a legend, the Flemish glass painter Valerio Profondavalle of the Veneranda Fabbrica del Duomo di Milano, who used to use saffron as a pigment, added it to a rice dish at a wedding feast. Risotto is believed to have originated in what is now known as Lombardy. The first recipe identifiable as risotto dates from 1809. It includes rice sautéed in butter, sausages, bone marrow, and onions with broth with saffron gradually added. There is a recipe for a dish named as a risotto in the 1854 Trattato di cucina (Treatise on Cooking) by Giovanni Vialardi, assistant chief cook to kings. However, who invented risotto in Milan cannot be stated with certainty.

The rice varieties associated with risotto were developed in the 20th century, starting with Maratelli in 1914.

== Rice varieties ==
A high-starch, round, medium- or short- grain white rice is usually used for making risotto. Such rices can absorb liquids and release starch, so they are stickier than the long grain varieties. The principal varieties used in Italy are Arborio, Baldo, Carnaroli, Maratelli, Padano, Roma, and Vialone Nano. Carnaroli, Maratelli (a historical Italian variety), and Vialone Nano are considered to be the best (and most expensive) varieties, with different users preferring one over another. They have slightly different properties. For example, Carnaroli is less likely than Vialone Nano to get overcooked, but the latter, being smaller, cooks faster and absorbs condiments better. Other varieties such as Baldo, Originario, Ribe, and Roma may be used but will not have the creaminess of the traditional dish; these varieties are considered better for soups and other non-risotto rice dishes and sweet rice desserts. Rice designations of superfino, semifino, and fino refer to the grains' size and shape (specifically the length and the narrowness) and not the quality.

== Basic preparation ==
There are many different risotto recipes with different ingredients, but they are all based on rice of an appropriate variety, cooked in a standard procedure. Risotto, unlike other rice dishes, requires constant care and attention. The rice is not to be pre-rinsed, boiled, or drained, as washing would remove much of the starch required for a creamy texture.

The rice is first cooked briefly in a soffritto of onion and butter or olive oil to coat each grain in a film of fat, called tostatura; white wine is added and must be absorbed by the grains. When it has been absorbed, the heat is raised to medium–high, and boiling stock is gradually added in small amounts while stirring constantly. The constant stirring, with only a small amount of liquid present, forces the grains to rub against each other and release the starch from the outside of the grains into the surrounding liquid, creating a smooth creamy-textured mass. When the rice is cooked the pot is taken off the heat for mantecatura, vigorously beating in refrigerated balls of grated Parmesan cheese and butter, to make the texture as creamy and smooth as possible. It may be removed from the heat a few minutes early and left to cook with its residual heat.

Properly cooked risotto is rich and creamy, even if no cream is added, due to the starch in the grains.

== Italian regional variations ==
Many variations have their own names:

Name	Photo	Description
Risotto alla milanese		There are various versions of risotto alla milanese. According to Elizabeth David in her Italian Food, "The classic one is made simply with chicken broth and flavoured with saffron; butter and grated Parmesan cheese are stirred in at the end of the cooking, and more cheese and butter served with it. The second version is made with beef marrow and white wine; a third with Marsala. In each case saffron is used as a flavouring."
Risotto al Barolo		A speciality of Piedmont, made with red wine, which may include sausage meat or borlotti beans
Risotto al nero di seppia		A speciality of Veneto, made with cuttlefish cooked with their ink sacs intact, leaving the risotto black
Risi e bisi		A Veneto spring dish that is correctly served with a spoon rather than a fork; it is a soup so thick that it resembles a risotto. It is made with green peas using the stock from the fresh young pods, flavoured with pancetta.
Risotto alla zucca		Made with pumpkin, nutmeg, and grated cheese
Risotto alla pilota		A speciality of Mantua, Lombardy, made with sausage, pork, and Parmesan cheese
Risotto ai funghi		A variant made with mushrooms such as porcini, Suillus luteus, Kuehneromyces mutabilis or Agaricus bisporus
Risotto ai frutti di mare		A variant made with seafood of seaside Italian cities
Risotto al tartufo nero		Made with, usually, black truffle

== See also ==
Media related to Risotto at Wikimedia Commons Risotto at the Wikibooks Cookbook subproject

- List of rice dishes
