= Oppeano =

- Comune
- City of Oppeano
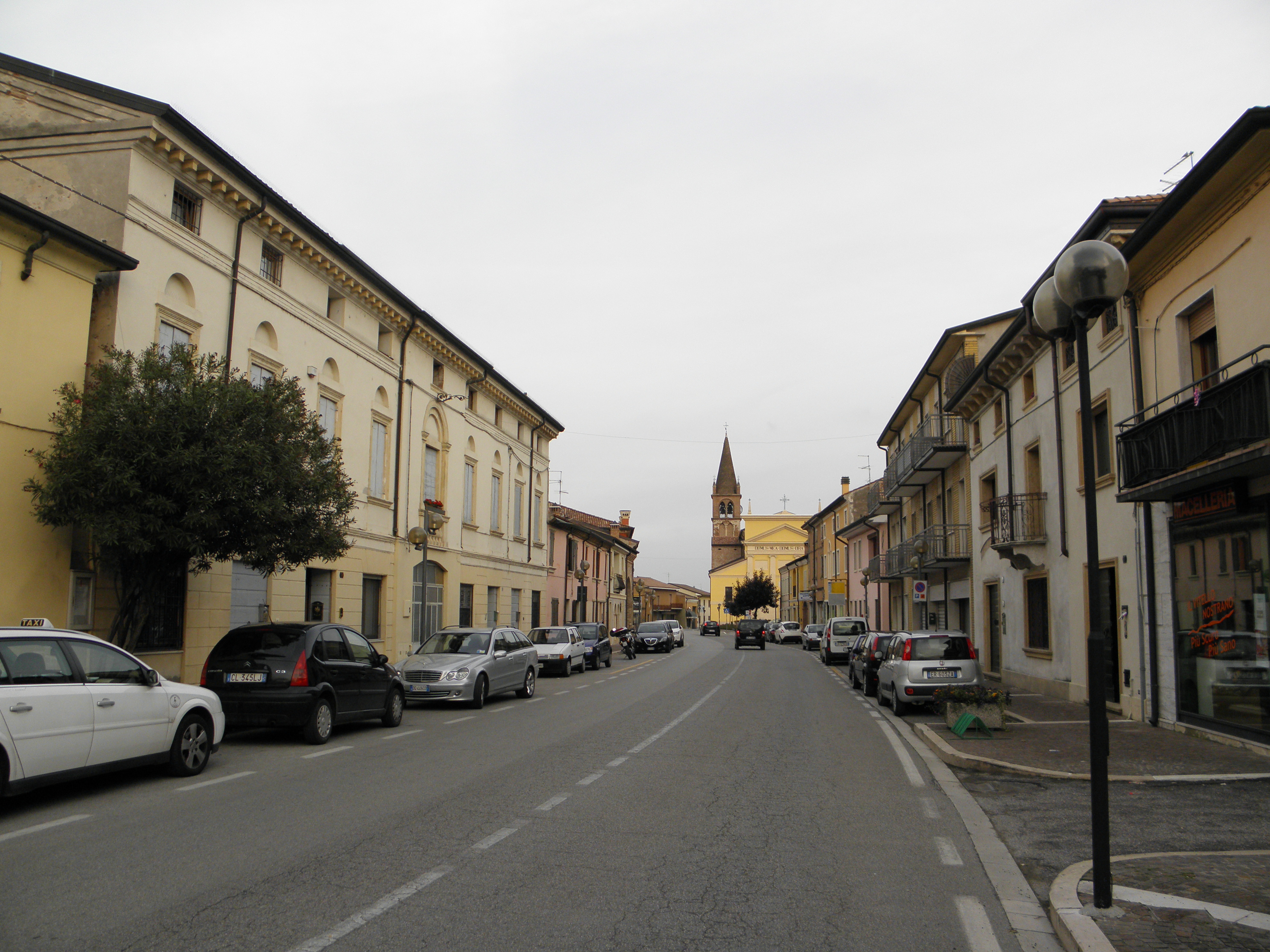
- View of the main street of Oppeano (Via Roma), with the parish church of Santa Maria Addolorata e San Giovanni Battista in the background

- Coat of arms

- Location within Italy Location within Veneto
- Coordinates: 45°18′N 11°11′E
- Country: Italy
- Region: Veneto
- Province: Verona (VR)
- Frazioni: Cà degli Oppi, Mazzantica, Vallese, Villafontana (partially)

Government
  - Mayor: Pietro Luigi Giaretta (Lega Nord)

Area
  - Total: 46.95 km^{2} (18.13 sq mi)
- Elevation: 26 m (85 ft)

Population (1 January 2009)
  - Total: 9,005
  - Density: 191.8/km^{2} (496.8/sq mi)
- Demonym: Oppeanesi
- Time zone: UTC+1 (CET)
  - Summer (DST): UTC+2 (CEST)
- Postal code: 37050
- Dialing code: 045
- Patron saint: St. John the Baptist
- Saint day: June 24
- Website: Official website

Oppeano is a comune (municipality) in the Province of Verona in the Italian region Veneto, located about 90 kilometres (56 mi) west of Venice and about 20 kilometres (12 mi) southeast of Verona.

== Climate ==
The climate is subtropical humid, with cool winters, with rare snowfall, and summers are very hot and humid. There are many types of palm trees, a path of subtropical climate, although still not missing the snow.

== Twin towns ==
- Montegranaro, Italy
- Mereto di Tomba, Italy
