= Lessinia =

Alpine supergroup in the Venetian Prealps

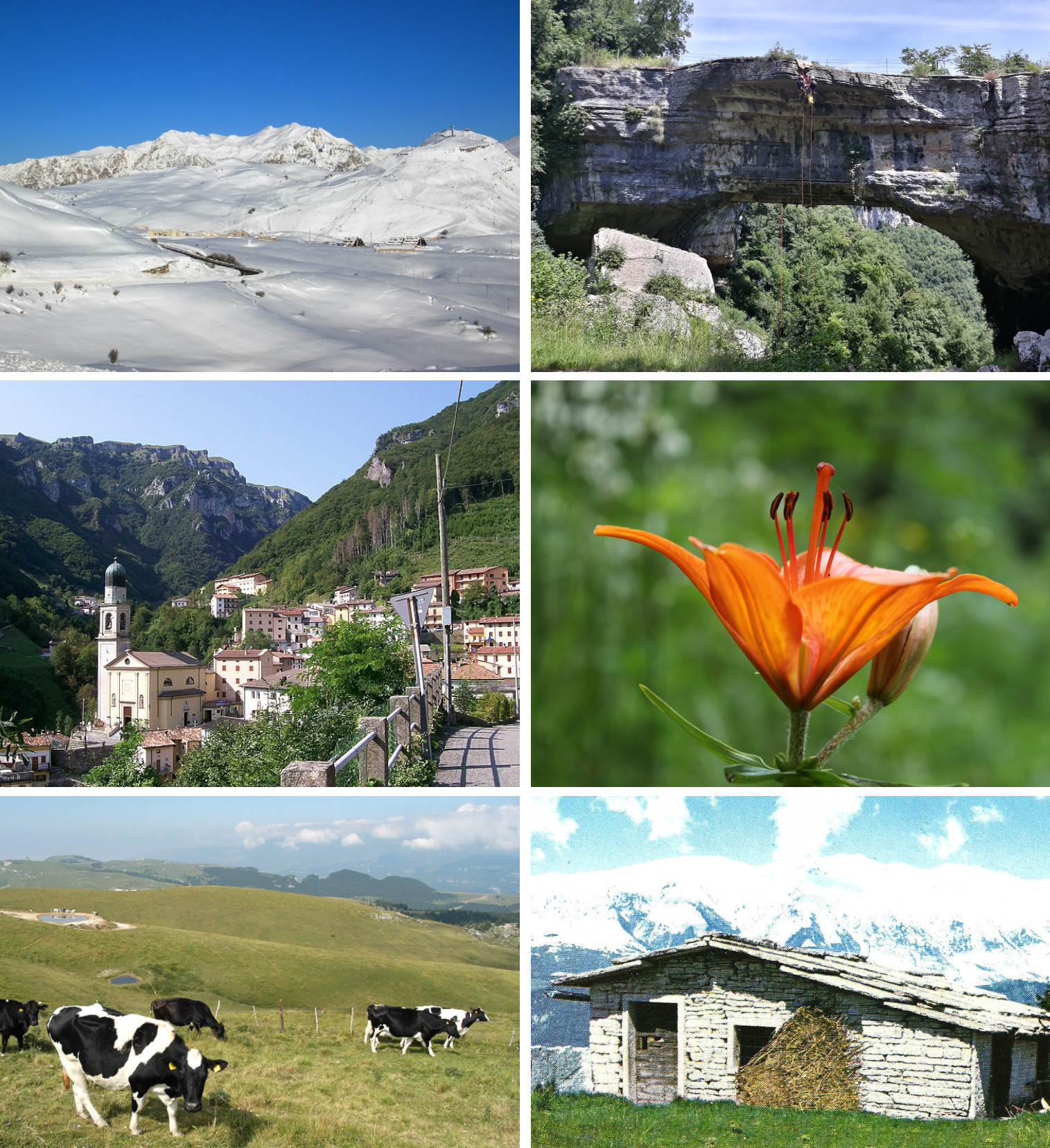
- Some photos of Lessinia. From top to bottom: winter view of upper Lessinia with the ski slopes of San Giorgio, Ponte di Veja, the village of Giazza, a flower in the Fraselle valley, summer pastures, a typical Lessinian stone building (lastame).

Highest point
- Coordinates: 45°41′2.05″N 11°13′0.31″E

Geography
- Country: Italy
- Province: Province of Verona, Province of Vicenza and Trentino
- Parent range: Venetian Prealps

Lessinia, or Lessini Mountains, is a plateau and alpine supergroup located mainly in the province of Verona and partially in the provinces of Vicenza and Trento.

Part of the Lessinia territory constitutes the Lessinia Regional Nature Park. It is bordered to the north by the Ronchi Valley and the Carega Group, to the east by the Leogra Valley, to the south by the course of the Adige River and the upper Veronese plain, and to the west by the Lagarina Valley. Its peaks reach an altitude between 1,500 and 1,800 m above sea level.

From the earliest times Lessinia saw the presence of man, who could easily find flint there and take refuge in its many caves and shelters. The spread of castellieri, small fortified settlements placed on the top of the hills, of which only a few traces remain now scattered throughout the territory, dates back to the beginning of the 2nd millennium BC. Before the arrival of the Romans, which occurred between the 3rd and 2nd centuries B.C., the area was inhabited by various peoples of Rhaetian origin, including the Arusnates. At that time the plateau was almost entirely occupied by forests for the lower part, while the esplanades higher up were used for summer grazing. Following the fall of the Roman Empire, the territory went through a noticeable demographic decline, which was not interrupted until the early 11th century.

From the Carolingian age, until the advent of the communal age, much of Lessinia was under the control of the Veronese Church, a dominion that went into crisis with the rise of the wool merchants of which the Della Scala family, future lords of Verona, were the city exponents. In 1287, Bishop Bartolomeo della Scala allowed a group of settlers of German origin to settle in the area of present-day Roverè Veronese, forming the first nucleus of the Cimbrians of Lessinia. With the devotion of Verona to Venice in 1404, the plateau also came under the rule of the Serenissima, which proceeded to grant the inhabitants various privileges in exchange for guarding the northern border. The arrival of Napoleon brought about major changes in the administrative structure of the area, some of which were maintained by subsequent Austrian rule. The years following the annexation of Veneto to the Kingdom of Italy were very hard on the population, which experienced famine and epidemics. Spared from the tragic events of World War I and World War II, the end of the 20th century was characterized by a gradual depopulation of the Lessinian municipalities in favor of emigration to the city.

== Toponym ==
Historical names used in Veronese documents for this territory are Luxino, Lixino, Lesinio, Lissinorum and Lissinia, always with the meaning of "land used and prepared for pastures." The earliest known document in which the term appears is a deed dated May 7, 814, in which the gastald Ildemanno of Verona donated "campo meo in Luxino ad Alpes facienda, una cum capilo pasquo" to the Veronese monastery of Santa Maria in Organo. It may also have originated from the Veronese dialect word le sime, i.e., peaks, or from the Venetian lisso or lissio, i.e., a channel of beams for plants to slide down.

== Geography ==
=== Boundaries and landscape ===
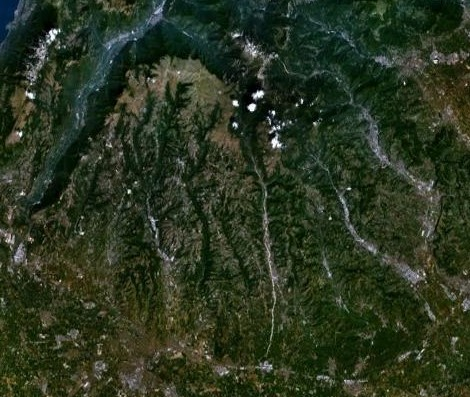
Satellite image of Lessinia

Enclosed on the north by the deep and wild Val di Ronchi and the majestic Carega Group, bounded on the east by the Val Leogra, on the southeast by the hills of Monteviale, on the southwest by the course of the Adige and the upper Veronese plain, and on the west by the Val Lagarina, it is almost a unit in itself within the Venetian Prealps. It is furrowed by numerous valleys that descend from the high pastures and fan out toward Verona and the plain.

Proceeding from west to east are the valleys of Fumane, Marano and Negrar (which together constitute a unit that has more historical than geographical character: the Valpolicella) and then the Valpantena, Squaranto, Mezzane, d'Illasi, Tramigna, d'Alpone, Chiampo and Agno valleys. Its heights to the west fall within the Venetian Pre-Alps, with peaks between 1,500 and 1,800 m, and the Carega group to the northeast (which exceeds 2,200 m). In contrast, the central range is between 1000 and 1300 m.

Some of the peaks include: Corno d'Aquilio, Monte Tomba, Cima Trappola.

The landscape of the High Pastures of Lessinia has been officially recognized as an agrarian landscape and included in the National Register of Historic Rural Landscapes, prepared by Decree No. 17070 of November 19, 2012, of the Ministry of Agriculture, Food and Forestry Policies.

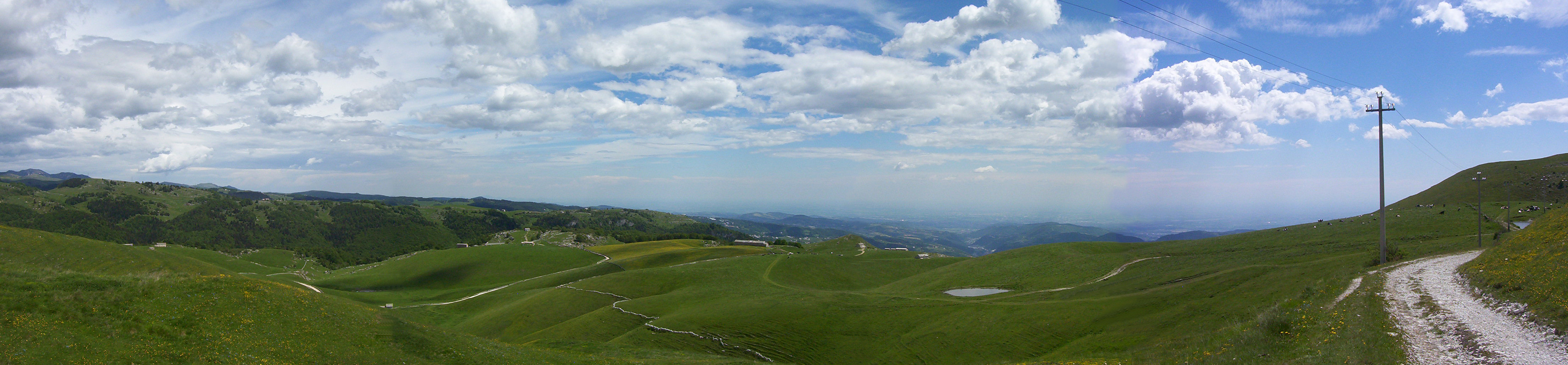
Panorama of Lessinia above the Fittanze Pass

=== Hydrography ===
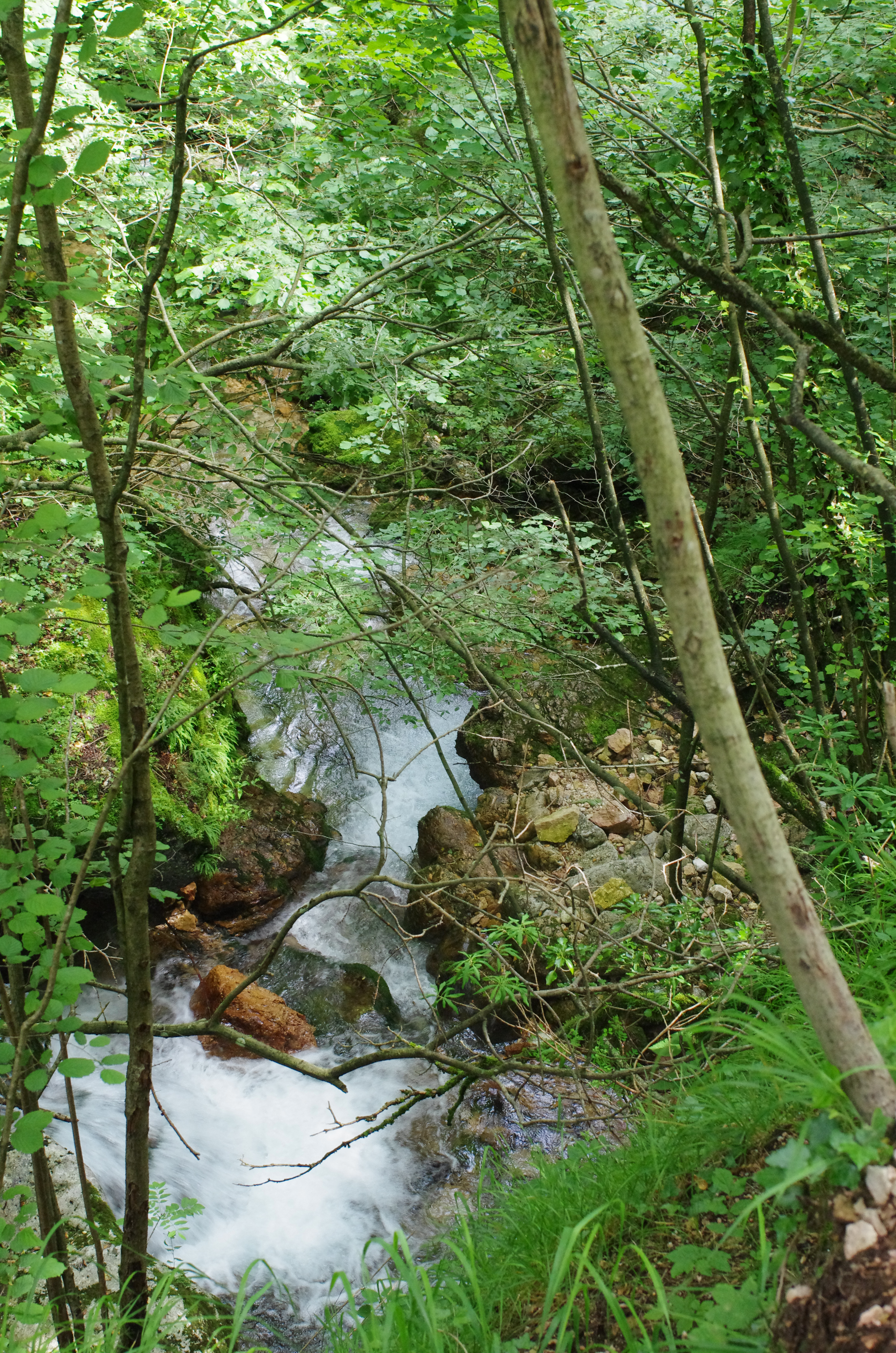
Fraselle Creek

The phenomenon of karstification typical of the limestone rocks that form Lessinia has made its hydrographic network highly articulated and varied, characterized by a great ramification of streams that during the glacial and quaternary periods have contributed to carve out the stream valleys that make up the territory. Throughout the plateau there are a number of springs, both temporary ones related to snow melt and rainfall, and permanent ones, which flow mainly at the outlet of the valleys between the upper and lower plains. The most notable ones are found on the Trentino side in the Ronchi valley, about 11 km long and crossed by the Ala stream, and in Val Bona, while on the other sides those in Val di Illasi and between Velo and Val di Mazzano are the most substantial.

Below is a list of the main watercourses present in Lessinia starting from the west and going eastward. At Fumane transits the progno of the same name (a term in Veronese dialect for a stream), which after originating from Mount San Giovanni and Mount Loffa travels about 14 km of the Progni valley receiving water from numerous tributaries. The Marano di Valpolicella valley, just 7 km long, is traversed by the Marano stream coming from Vajo Camporal and whose source is located at Mount Noroni. Further east, the 11-km-long Negrar di Valpolicella valley is traversed by the stream of the same name, which originates from the Fane stream and has as tributaries the Fiamene, Prun, Mazzano, San Ciriaco, Sieresol, Pozzetta, Quena and Cancello streams, among others. In the lowlands, the Negrar and Marano streams join and then flow into the Adige River.

Near the city of Verona, the Quinzano stream and the Avesa stream reach the plains, both of which then flow into the Adige. East of Verona is the great Valpantena valley, oriented north-south and extending for about 26 km with a catchment area of 150 km², ending in the north with a bifurcation that divides the Alta Valpantena from the Vajo dell'Anguilla. The stream of Valpantena, after passing through the built-up area of Borgo Venezia, flows into the Adige west of San Michele Extra. Further east, from Cima Trappola originates the Vajo Squaranto, which joins the Vajo Illasi after receiving several tributaries including the Fibbio and Marcellise streams, at San Martino Buon Albergo and then terminates in the Adige before Belfiore.

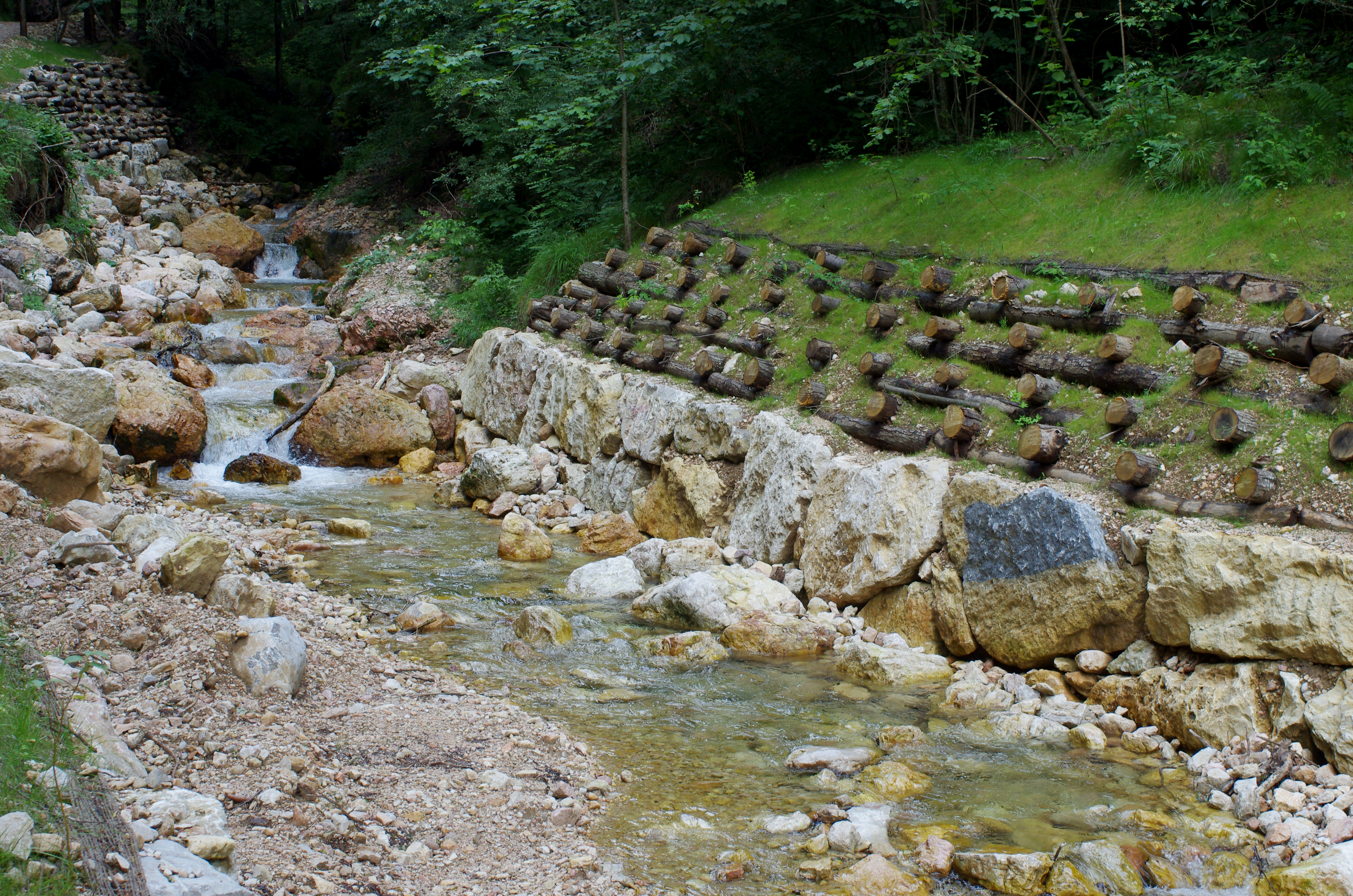
Fraselle stream at Giazza

The Val d'Illasi, with its 22 km, bisects the Lessinia plateau going all the way into the Carega group. The valley is very narrow in its northernmost portions, recording just under 200 meters in width at Selva di Progno and then opening up at Illasi to about 3 km. Near Giazza a valley opens up in a westerly-easterly direction, the Fraselle valley traversed by the stream of the same name.

The last major valley in the province of Verona is the Val d'Alpone in which the Alpone torrent flows for about 32 km, which, originating at Mount Purga, ends its course in the Adige 7 km after passing through San Bonifacio. Finally, in the province of Vicenza, the Val del Chiampo extends for about 31 km entirely traversed by the Chiampo torrent, which also ends in the Adige after adding to its waters, originating at 1650 m above sea level, those of numerous streams.

=== Climate ===
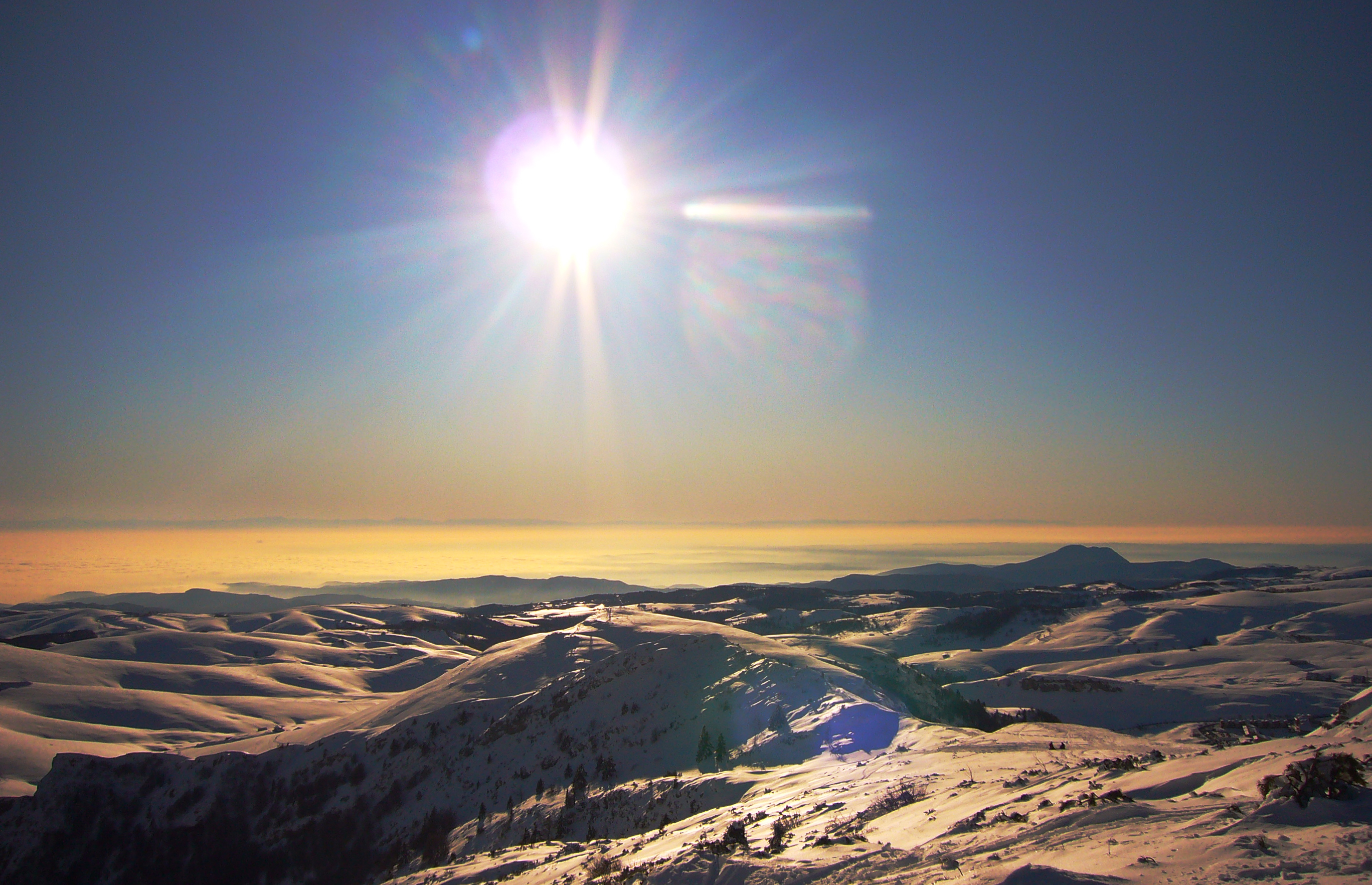
Snow-covered Lessinia as seen from Cima Trappola

Climatically, Lessina can be divided into three belts: a humid temperate one, sometimes tending to sub-Mediterranean climate allowing cultivation of olive trees, which extends from the foothills to about 700 m above sea level, a subsequent fresh temperate one between 700 m and 1 500 m, and finally a cold temperate one beyond 1 500 m. Average temperatures range between 5 °C and 13 °C with an average decrease of about 0.5 °C for every 100 m of altitude gained. The coldest month is January, with average lows often below -1 °C, while the hottest period is between July and August when highs reach between 22 °C and 29 °C. Relative humidity is between 50% and 70%.

Average precipitation around 850 mm is recorded at the valley floor, which increases significantly in a northerly direction. The lowest rainfall coincides with the months of January and February, and the secondary rainfall between July and September, with the exclusion of August when intense convective activity results in increased rainfall. The highest rainfall occurs in the months of October and November, while there is a secondary highest one between April and June. Snow, which is more frequent in the central and eastern zone, occurs in the winter months between December and mid-February, not exceeding 80 centimeters on average.

Climate tables for Velo Veronese (at 1 074 m a.s.l.) and Grezzana (at 267 m a.s.l.) are given as examples:

Climate data for Velo Veronese
Month	Jan	Feb	Mar	Apr	May	Jun	Jul	Aug	Sep	Oct	Nov	Dec	Year
Mean daily maximum °F	37.4	38.8	45.5	50.7	60.4	66.9	71.2	71.2	64.9	56.3	45.3	38.7	53.9
Mean daily minimum °F	23.2	23.0	29.5	35.4	42.8	48.7	53.2	53.1	47.1	40.3	31.3	25.3	37.7
Average precipitation inches	3.2	3.0	3.7	5.2	5.4	5.0	4.3	4.8	4.2	5.4	5.6	4.0	53.8
Mean daily maximum °C	3.0	3.8	7.5	10.4	15.8	19.4	21.8	21.8	18.3	13.5	7.4	3.7	12.2
Mean daily minimum °C	−4.9	−5.0	−1.4	1.9	6.0	9.3	11.8	11.7	8.4	4.6	−0.4	−3.7	3.2
Average precipitation mm	81	77	95	132	138	127	110	121	106	138	141	101	1,367

Climate data for Grezzana
Month	Jan	Feb	Mar	Apr	May	Jun	Jul	Aug	Sep	Oct	Nov	Dec	Year
Mean daily maximum °F	42.1	44.2	54.0	61.2	70.3	59.7	81.7	81.3	74.3	63.9	51.4	43.3	60.6
Mean daily minimum °F	28.9	30.9	37.4	44.1	51.6	57.7	62.1	61.3	55.2	47.3	37.9	30.9	45.4
Average precipitation inches	2.4	2.2	2.7	3.6	4.1	4.0	3.7	4.0	3.2	3.9	3.8	2.8	40.4
Mean daily maximum °C	5.6	6.8	12.2	16.2	21.3	15.4	27.6	27.4	23.5	17.7	10.8	6.3	15.9
Mean daily minimum °C	−1.7	−0.6	3.0	6.7	10.9	14.3	16.7	16.3	12.9	8.5	3.3	−0.6	7.5
Average precipitation mm	60	56	68	91	103	102	93	102	82	99	96	71	1,023

The dominant winds blow from west to east while those from the north are largely stopped by the major elevations. There are a number of minor currents and breezes that go from low to high, resulting in condensation and cloud formation in the higher areas.

=== Seismicity ===
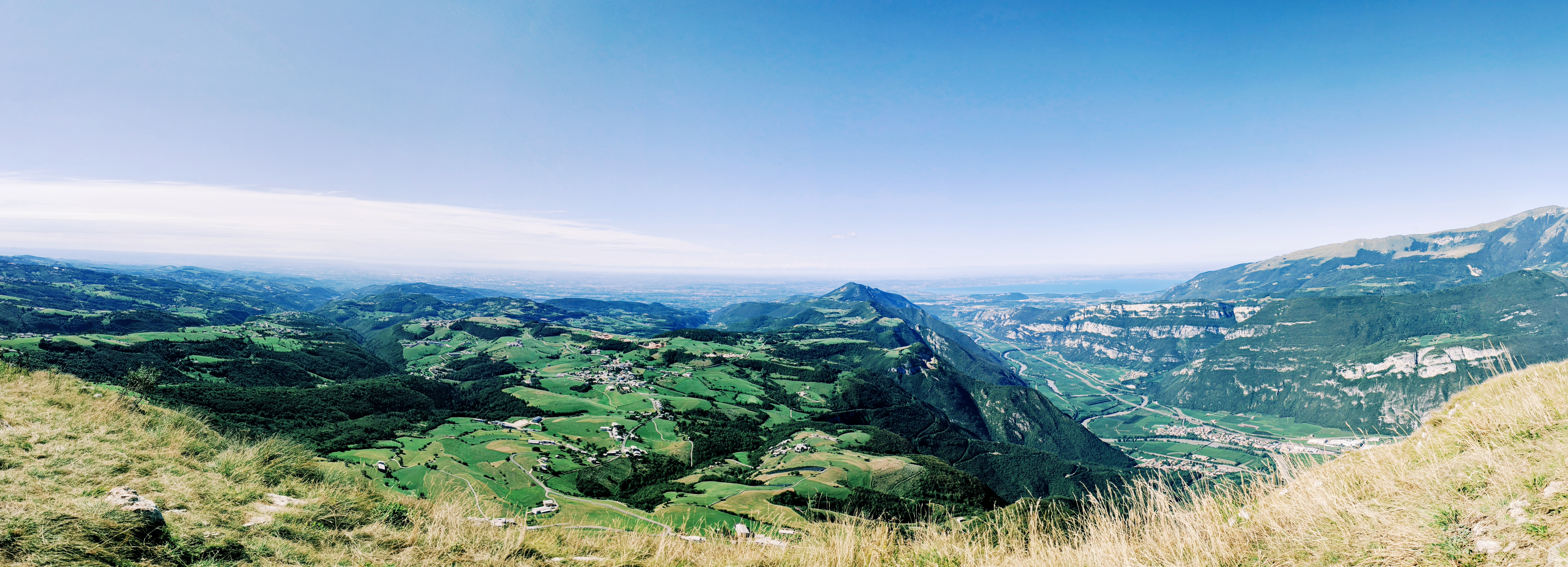
View from the Corno d'Aquilio

Lessinia has a medium level of seismicity. However, the seismic phenomena that are encountered are not attributable to volcanic causes but rather to the northward advance of the Apennine chain, which results in compression and dislocation of crustal rock masses. Therefore, these are superficial interplate earthquakes affecting the rocky belt located between 20 and 25 km deep. The Illasi valley, which is characterized by a system of faults extending in a north and south direction, is the one at greatest risk and which recorded several telluric events in the late 19th century, most notably the earthquake of June 7, 1891. Likewise, the piedmont portion immediately north of the city of Verona has been the subject of numerous earthquakes throughout history.

== History ==
=== Prehistory ===
The Lessinia territory appears to have been inhabited since the earliest times; the ease with which flint could be found for the production of objects, the availability of many caves and rock shelters, and other economic and security-related reasons were the factors that led various prehistoric communities to settle there.

The earliest evidence dates back to the Lower Paleolithic and demonstrates human presence in several localities, including Riparo Soman, Ponte di Veja, Villa (Quinzano), Cà Verde (Sant'Ambrogio di Valpolicella), and Fumane Cave. Also in Quinzano, numerous remains from the later Riss-Würm interglacial period have been found, such as spearheads, axes, sickles, and fragments of human skull bones. Other Middle Paleolithic settlements have been found on the Torricelle, Monte Cucco, Monte Loffa and at Azzago. The findings, however, suggest that these were not true stable human settlements, as it turns out that they practiced a nomadic life, although it is assumed that the Cà Verde area was an exception. Among the fauna of the time could be found cave bears, wolves, hyenas and various steppe rodents.

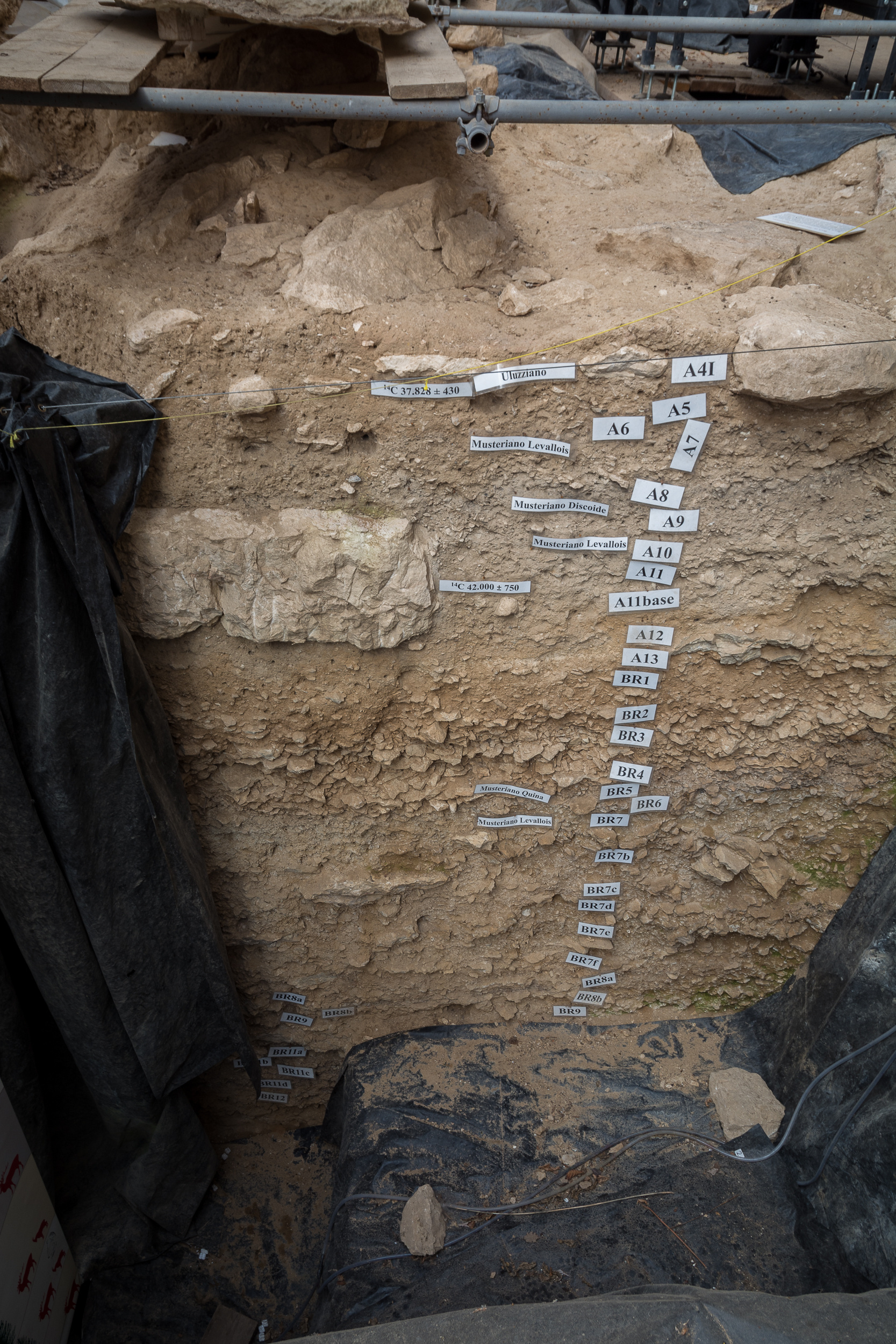
Excavation in Fumane Cave showing the various layers attributable to different historical eras

Studies have suggested that in the Upper Paleolithic the populations settled in lower Lessinia lagged behind in terms of civilization compared to more general models. The artistic testimonies and complex artifacts dating from this period are scarce. To find signs of a more complex civilization one must wait for the Copper Age, which saw the presence of man on the hills of Marcellise, at Ponte di Veja, on Mount Loffa, at Molina, and at Colombare of Negrar, where a hearth was found, probably used for ritual purposes.

It is from the beginning of the 2nd millennium B.C., at the height of the Iron Age, that the phenomenon of castellieri, small settlements of huts located in a semicircle, fortified with dry-stone walls and placed on the top of the reliefs, is found in the area. Although only a few scattered traces of them remain in the surrounding area, some of them have been identified near Arbizzano (Negrar), Fumane, and Marano di Valpolicella. One of the best preserved, dating from the Iron Age, was found at Castel Sottosengia, near Breonio, which has now disappeared to make way for a marble quarry. The discovery on site of some materials such as tin and copper has suggested that local people engaged in trade with other localities outside Italy as well.

Many of the objects found are now in the Paleontological and Prehistoric Museum of Sant'Anna d'Alfaedo and the Civic Museum of Natural History in Verona.

=== Roman era ===
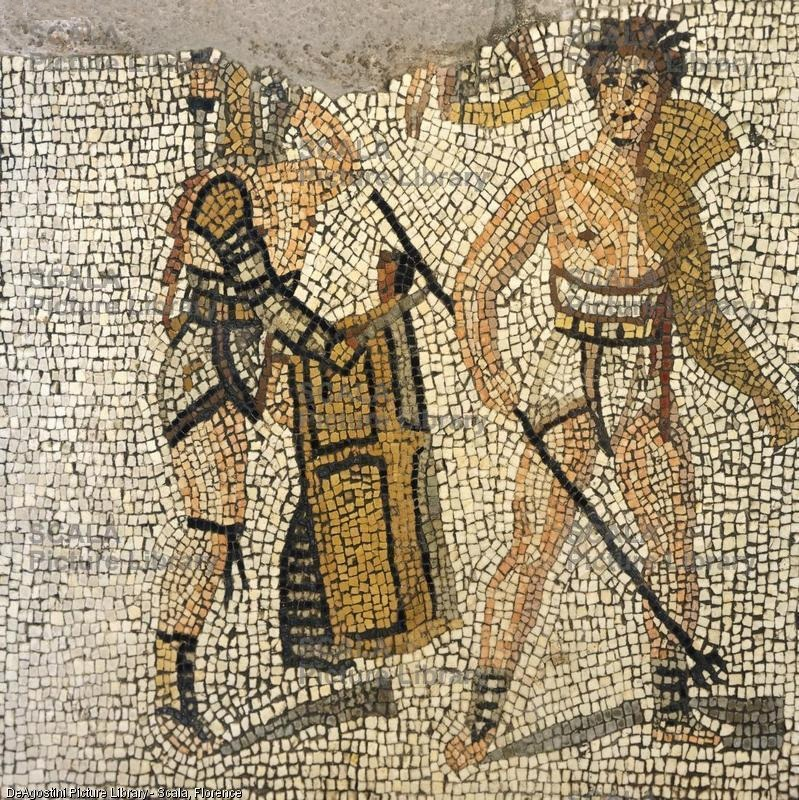
Mosaic from the floor of a Roman villa found in Negrar di Valpolicella

Since before the beginning of Roman rule, which began between the 3rd and 2nd centuries B.C., the territory of Lessinia was inhabited by various populations of Rhaetian origin. A separate mention should be made of the ancient inhabitants of Valpolicella, the Arusnates, whose Rhaetian or Etruscan origin is debated; this population enjoyed special administrative autonomy even after the arrival of the Romans by forming the Pagus Arusnatium.

Two of the most important Roman roads converged on Verona's territory, the Via Claudia Augusta, which connected northern Europe to the Po Valley, and the Via Postumia, which, starting from Liguria, extended to the empire's easternmost borders. The passage of these fundamental routes, which joined in the city of Verona, made the area strategically very important. Their presence also influenced the Lessinian hill territory where secondary routes were built that joined them.

At that time Lessinia, part of the Veronese countryside, was almost entirely occupied by forests for the lower part (Frizzolana and Selva veronensis) while the plains higher up (Lessinium) were used for summer grazing. In addition to grazing activities, in Lessinia the gathering of herbs, berries, mushrooms, firewood and timber for construction was practiced. From the quarries white and reddish limestone was extracted, widely used for town buildings. Despite this, much of the territory was uninhabited. There were, therefore, few signs left by the Romans, especially in the higher areas, who limited themselves to guarding the accesses, leaving the locals with the power to organize themselves administratively. At San Mauro di Saline there was a cart road that went up the ridge and was used for the transhumance to the heights of goats and sheep. At Velo Veronese there was a military fort.

The situation was different for the villages at the bottom of the valley in which, as a result of the centuriation of the 2nd century B.C., intense agricultural activity developed and where, at the same time, Roman villas arose whose owner, usually residing in the city, went there to administer his funds. Remains of some of them have been found in Negrar, Romagnano, Azzago, and Colognola ai Colli. From the Valpantena and Valpolicella departed the aqueducts that supplied the city of Verona. A hypogeum from the late imperial period has been found at Santa Maria in Stelle.

Beginning in the 4th century the Christianization of the people living in Lessinia began to take place; the burning of the temple of Minerva that stood in Marano (where the sanctuary of Santa Maria di Valverde stands today) is evidence of that process.

=== Medieval Era ===
==== Early Middle Ages ====
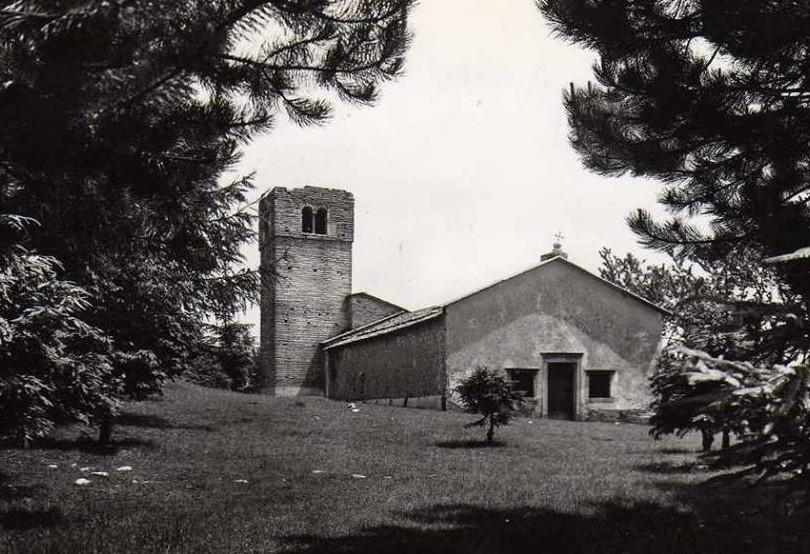
Parish church of San Giovanni in Loffa, perhaps the oldest in Lessinia

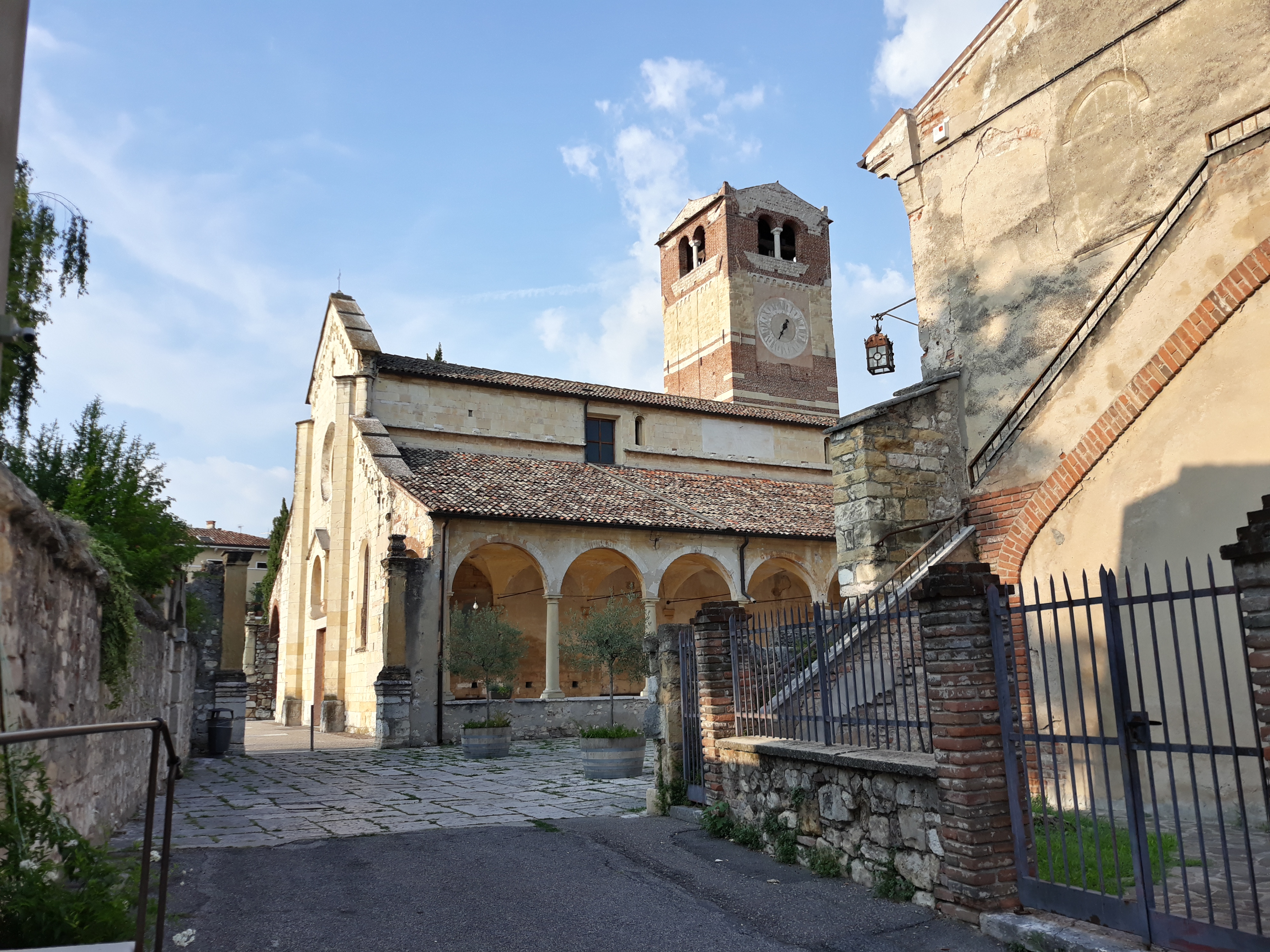
Parish church of San Floriano, in existence as early as 905, boasted jurisdictional power over much of Valpolicella

With the fall of the Western Roman Empire there was a decrease in population in Lessinia and in the economic activities that took place there. In Lombard times many plots of Lessinia were given as a feudal benefit to the Arimannia, free men who were able to bear arms. With the end of the Lombard reign and the advent of the Carolingian age they became mere gastalds, that is, civil officials delegated to oversee the lands of the new feudal lords, who were mostly ecclesiastical bodies from the abbey of St. Columbanus of Bobbio and the court of the Priory of the monastery of St. Columbanus of Bardolino and Verona, and in particular the cathedral chapter, the monastery of San Zeno, the monastery of Santa Maria in Organo and of Saints Nazaro and Celso. Toward the end of the early Middle Ages the territory appeared to be organized into parishes, of which the most important were those of Grezzana, San Floriano, San Martino in Negrar, Arbizzano and Montorio, Santa Maria in Tregnago, and San Giovanni in Loffa, the latter probably the oldest in western Lessinia. In the 10th century there were at least three sculdasci placed to oversee areas of particular strategic interest. (Note: One oversaw the Pruvinianense Valley, one the Fibbio River, and one the Illasi Valley. In: Sauro et al. (2017, p. 38).) A document dated May 7, 814 mentions the term "Lessinia" for the first time.

On the other hand, the name Valpolicella (Valle Pulliscella), the area comprising the southwestern part of Lessinia, appears for the first time in a decree of Frederick Barbarossa dated August 24, 1177, in which the emperor granted to the Congregation of the Clergy the lands around the Castrum Rotaris in the surroundings of today's Kastelruth: this has nothing to do with the Dolomite locality of the same name, since it is instead a hamlet of San Pietro in Cariano (VR). Again Barbarossa the following year gave comital rights over land and villas in the area to Count Sauro of the Sambonifacio family. However, administratively Valpolicella had no recognition until the communal age when a "colonel" was established with partial autonomy, having to accept a captain from Verona when the need arose. In 1311 with Federico della Scala, the county of Valpolicella was born, which would enjoy greater freedom and various tax breaks, prerogatives it would retain for several centuries even after the end of Scaliger rule.

The territory of Valpantena belonged largely to the canons of the cathedral. Through the 921 will of the bishop of Verona Nokterio one learns that in Marzana there was a castle cum turribus et omnibus in circuito municionibus suis and that another was built in Grezzana. Others were built in later years; between the 10th and 11th centuries castra are documented at Poiano (built before 968), at Rocca di Lugo, at Azzago, at Romagnano, at Montorio and at Arbetu (present-day Erbezzo, mentioned in 1014). In the same years the cathedral chapter gained more and more power locally: a diploma of Otto II in 983 assigned some castles to it, while in 1027 Henry II granted it the ability to collect taxes.

==== Communal age: wool production and the establishment of the Scaligers ====
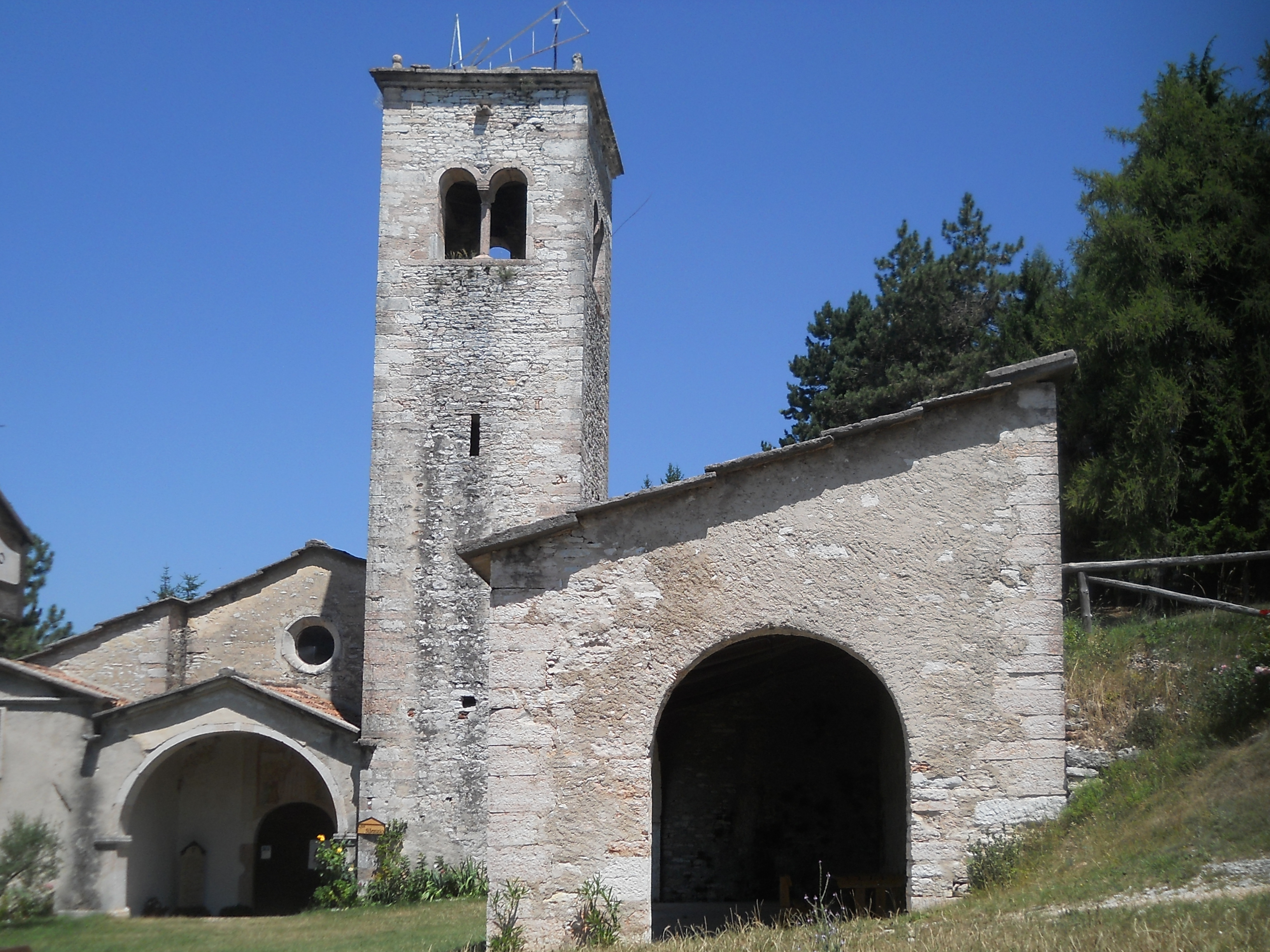
The Romanesque church of San Leonardo on Mount Moro in San Mauro di Saline

With the advent of the communal age, there was a repopulation of the area with Grezzana, elevated to a parish seat, being the most important center. Fiscally, the valley was organized into a colonate while jurisdictionally into a captaincy. This new political order had repercussions on the territory, which saw the gradual abandonment of the castles until all traces disappeared, with the exclusion of that of Montorio because of its strategic position. At that time, the upper Lessinia was divided into Frizzolana, which included the wooded belt located between about 900 and 1200 meters and owned by city ecclesiastical bodies; the Silva Communis Veronae, located between 1200 and 1400 and belonging to the municipality of Verona, which disposed several laws for the collection of wood to prevent impoverishment; and Lessinio, the high-altitude pastures largely owned by secular landowners or monasteries and where wool was produced, a key element in the Verona economy at that time.

During the thirteenth century in Verona the art of wool came to be established as one of the most important city economic institutions, and as a result the upper Lessinia took on the role of a strategically crucial area for sheep grazing. This situation led the ecclesiastical entities to cede, either by lease or by pure alienations, many of their Lessinia territories in favor of the wealthy city families engaged in the wool industry. This was affirmed with the seizure of power by the Della Scala seigniory, long involved in the wool trade, who little by little succeeded in controlling the city's religious institutions by effectively taking possession of their mountain funds. These were the years in which the so-called Potesteria Lissinorum came into being, which would find full development in the subsequent Venetian era, that is, the temporary jurisdiction over the population residing in the high-altitude pastures by, formally, the monastery of San Zeno, but in practice entrusted to the Della Scala family as feudal lords.

==== The immigration of the Cimbrians ====
On February 5, 1287, while Alberto della Scala was lord of Verona, Bishop Bartolomeo della Scala granted a group of settlers of German origin who had settled in the Vicentine plateau to settle in Lessinia in the area of today's Roverè Veronese and conferred on their two leaders, Olderico Vicentino and Olderico da Altissimo, the office of episcopal gastalds. This constituted the first nucleus of the Cimbrians of Lessinia. The reason that prompted the bishop to call this population was purely economic in nature, namely the need for labor for the production of charcoal and lumber at lower costs than that which was imported from Trent. Several benefits were granted to this early community, such as exemption from military service, payment of taxes and the right to choose their own parish priest (jus patronatus). In the early years of the next century they came to colonize, with the assent of Cangrande della Scala, the Frizzolana at the expense of the canons of the cathedral. In 1375 they founded at the parish of Valdiporro and later that of Erbezzo, eventually settling also in San Mauro di Saline, Velo Veronese, Camposilvano, and Selva di Progno. Their rapid expansion was slowed only by the Black Death, which struck all of Europe without sparing Lessinia, which suffered a significant population decline.

=== Venetian domination ===
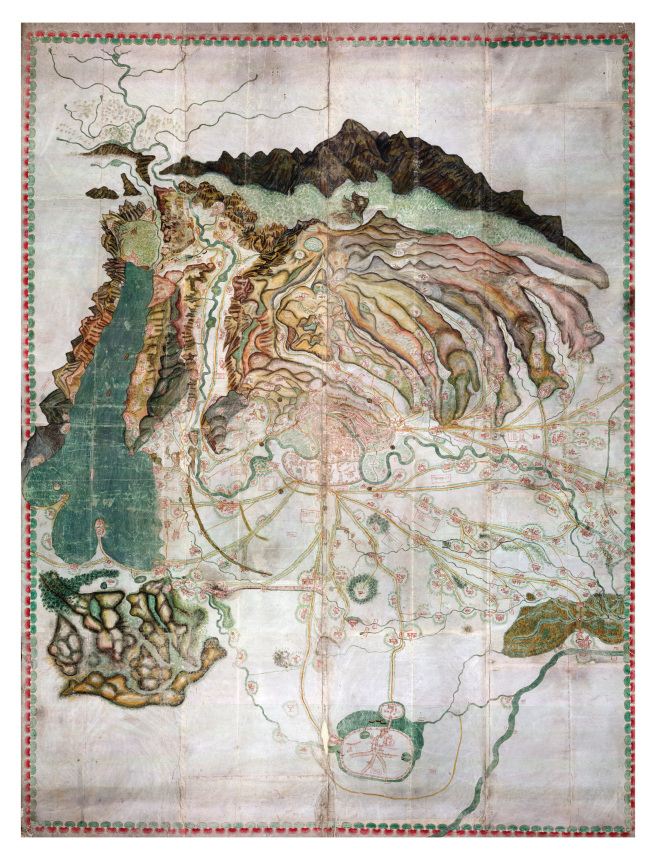
Almagià map, the oldest (1440) known cartographic representation of the Veronese territory (and Lessinia)

When the power of the Scaligeris ended and after a brief interlude under the rule of the Visconti and the Carraresi, with the devotion of Verona to Venice in 1404 Lessinia also became a territory of the Serenissima and remained so until its fall, except for the period of the War of the League of Cambrai.

The need to rely on loyal populations residing near the borders led the Venetian Republic to confirm and expand rights and privileges already granted to the inhabitants of this territory. For example, the inhabitants of Sant'Anna d'Alfaedo were allowed to carry out grazing and wood-gathering activities as long as they ensured armed control of the paths that led toward the border with the bishopric of Trent. To benefit the area, moreover, the Serenissima promoted the construction of a road, known as "della Selve Lessinee," that crossed the territory of the vicariate of Valpantena to head toward Lugo, Belloro and Lughezzano.

The oldest cartographic depiction of Lessinia appears in a map from 1440, called the Almagià map, where a large part of the Veronese territory is drawn. In that document it is easy to recognize, among other settlements, Sant'Anna d'Alfaedo with the localities of Cona and Cerna, both with their respective churches, and the area of Selva surrounded by woods; Bosco Chiesanuova appears with many buildings and a church; Valdiporro also has a church and several districts appear nearby; as well as the territories of Saline, Tavernole, Alcenago, Lugo, Azzago, and Romagnano.

Due to the privileges granted by the Serenissima and the period of relative peace, between the 14th and 16th centuries the population of Lessinia grew steadily at the same time as additional activities, such as pastoralism and agriculture, in addition to traditional coal production and wood gathering, became established. Despite this, the population still lived in severe economic straits, so much so that corn was almost exclusively the only food available. As the population grew, new settlements began to be built. Abandoning the old wooden dwellings, the inhabitants of Lessinia began to use red Verona marble, which was readily available locally and which was processed into regular slabs and was successfully exploited. Buildings dedicated to various activities were also constructed, such as baiti and caseare for milk processing, icehouses and kilns to obtain quicklime. Worthy of mention are the numerous buildings of a religious character that appeared almost everywhere in the Lessinian territory: small churches, capitals, steles, small chapels placed at crossroads, all of which are manifestations of the inhabitants' religious devotion that still adorn the landscape today.

=== From the modern age to the 20th century ===
Lessinia border boundary markers

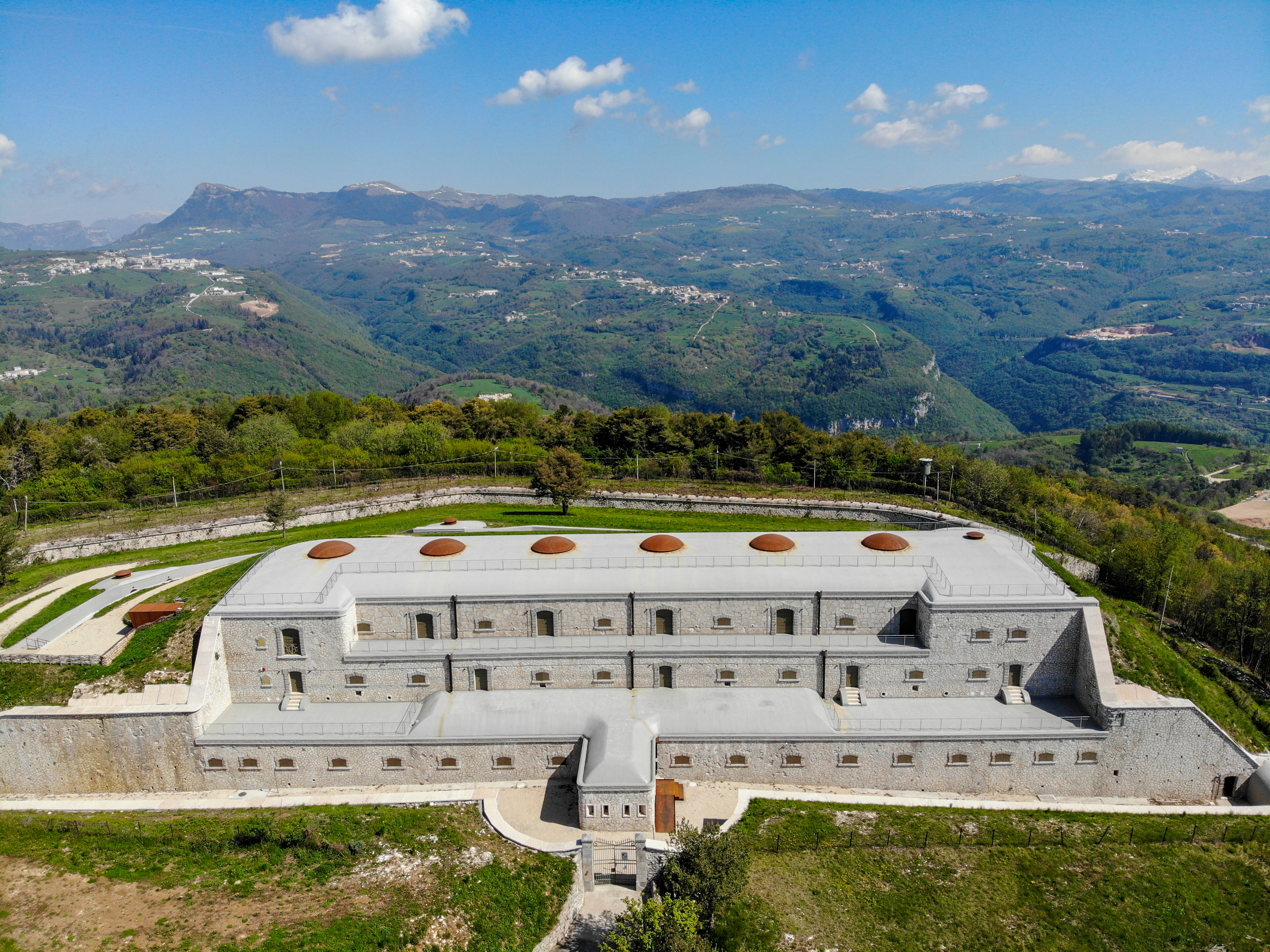
Fort of Monte Tesoro

When Napoleon's troops settled in Lessinia as a result of the Peace of Pressburg in 1805, great changes began in the administrative structure of the area: the borders changed several times and the bureaucratic apparatus went through simplifications. The presence of troops in the Lessinian villages was numerous and often frowned upon by the population. With the intention of learning more about the people who lived there, the French conducted two censuses and studied the spread of the Cimbrian language, ascertaining that it was still spoken in Selva di Progno, Campofontana and Giazza. In addition, the first secular public schools were founded. These reforms continued with the subsequent Austrian rule that lasted between 1814 and 1866 when there was the annexation of Veneto to the Kingdom of Italy. During this period there was also the establishment of a free medical service designed mainly to contain any epidemics, of which pellagra, smallpox, and cholera were typical, claiming victims among the malnourished population. Following the Third War of Independence, Lessinia was annexed by Italy and again became a borderland with the Austrian Empire. Therefore, numerous military defensive buildings were built, such as Fort Masua on Mount Pastello, Fort San Briccio, Fort Santa Viola above Azzago, and Fort Monte Tesoro. The network of carriage roads was also strengthened. The second half of the 19th century was not easy for the population of Lessinia: severe famines associated with unemployment led many people to emigrate abroad. The most widespread activities among the poor resident population were limited to livestock farming, cheese production and, in the central and eastern area, coal production; ice mining was also widespread and took place in the typical icehouses. The difficult living conditions also led to a considerable spread of smuggling with the neighboring Tyrol, with which salt, tobacco, coffee, spices, sugar and alcohol were exchanged.

Being a border territory, it was feared that Lessinia could be a theater of battles during World War I and thus it was fortified with trenches and military roads. The concerns, however, were not warranted and the plateau served only as a second line and as a training ground for soldiers while war activities were concentrated on nearby Mount Pasubio. With the end of hostilities, Trentino became Italian and therefore Lessina ceased to be a border territory. The already exhausted populations that resided there saw their living conditions worsen even more, so much so that there was heavy emigration, not only abroad, but also to neighboring territories. World War II did not involve the plateau any further, which, however, was occupied by the Wehrmacht after 1943. The most significant event was a fire set by German soldiers in the upper Alpone valley in retaliation for an action carried out by partisans against the occupying troops.

When the war ended, the subsequent economic miracle that swept Italy was not enough to put a stop to the depopulation of the higher and more remote areas of Lessinia. The introduction of new technologies and the growth of the industrial and service sectors in the valley caused some of the typical activities of the mountains to disappear so much so that the many residents ended up moving to the city, abandoning the ancient districts that ended up being completely uninhabited. In contrast to this, beginning in the 1960s and in the larger towns, new residences began to be built that were used by citizens as second homes for vacationing and, at the same time, the phenomenon of highland tourism was born.

== Flora and fauna ==
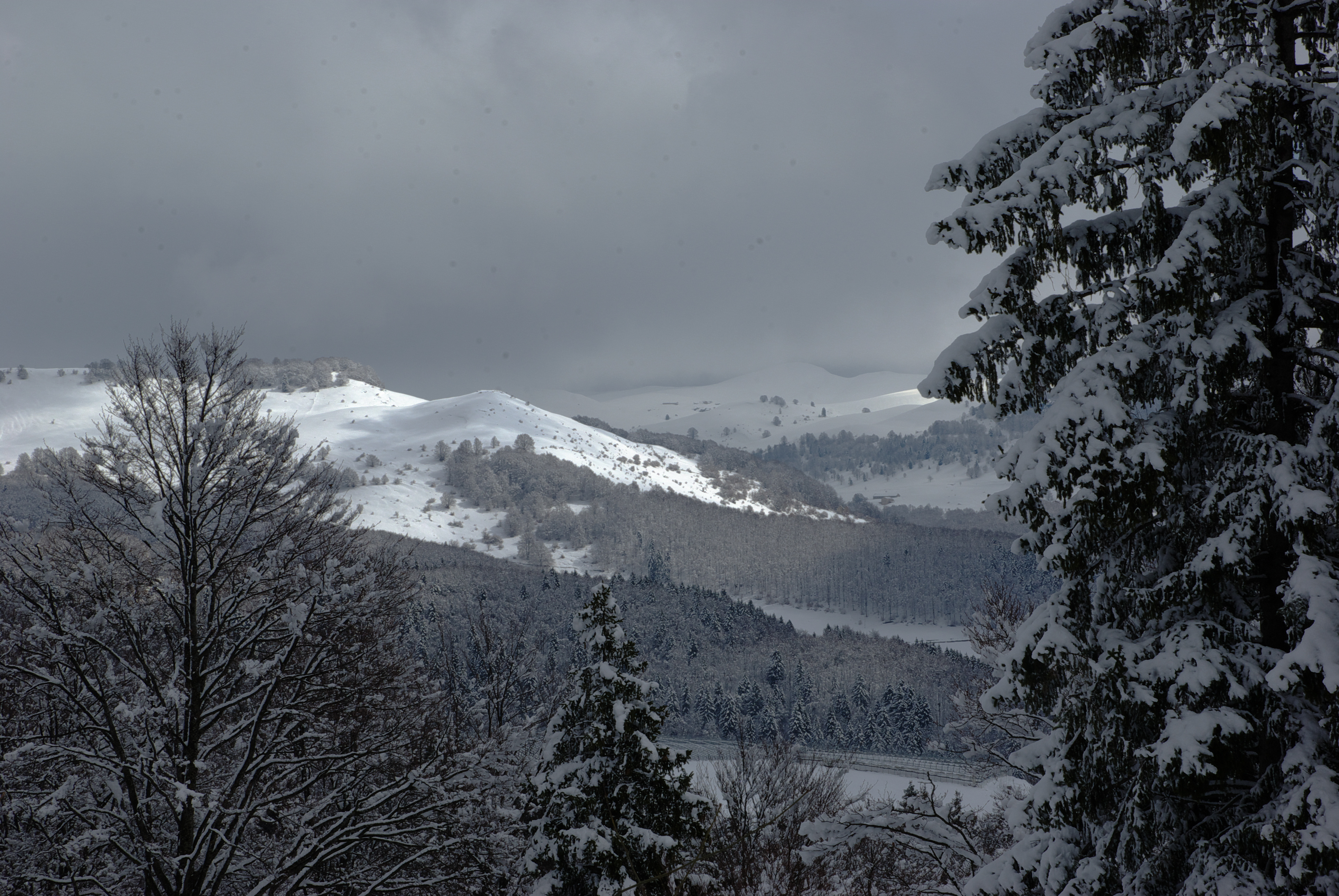
View above Bosco Chiesanuova, 2013

=== Birdwatching ===
In Lessinia, 170 species have been observed from 2006 to 2012, ranging from the most common ones such as various turdids, finches and titmice, to those more usual in the alpine environment such as capercaillie, black grouse, golden eagle, wallcreeper and dipper, and the more atypical ones such as black stork, black-winged stilt, cormorant, grey heron, egret, garganey or the spotted redshank.

Tourism related to nature and in particular birdwatching is also gradually developing in Lessinia, due to the presence of numerous alpine species such as the golden eagle, rock thrush or dipper. Recently, it is possible to see in winter a species that is uncommon in Italy, such as the snow bunting, which has brought many photographers and birdwatchers to Lessinia. The prime spot to observe this arctic passerine is Bocca di Selva.

=== The wolf ===
In early 2012, as a result of natural dispersal, the encounter and stabilization of two wolves belonging to different populations occurred: a male named Slavc belonging to the Dinaric population in dispersal from Slovenia, monitored with a radio collar as part of the European project "Life SloWolf," and a female belonging to the Italian population. The presence of these two wolves in Lessinia is of extraordinary scientific interest and it is the first case - after the disappearance of the wolf in the Alps - that a pair of the species was formed with individuals belonging to two different populations: the Dinaric and the Italian populations. The wolf was present in the Alps until the end of the 19th century and, more sporadically, in the first decades of the 20th century.

In Veneto the last wolf sightings date back to 1931 in the Belluno area (Fossa, 1988), while in Lessinia the species seems to have disappeared in the first half of the 1800s (Garbini, 1898), with sporadic isolated presences recorded in 1880 (Benetti, 2003). The wolf in Lessinia is historically linked to the socio-cultural traditions of the Cimbrian population, as attested by toponyms, fables, legends, proverbs and idioms dedicated to this animal.

In the locality "Riserva di Buse di Sopra" (Municipality of Velo Veronese) there is a stele bearing the following inscription: 1657 - CO - VELO - P - IL - CAS0 - FORD0 - DI - MADA - DE - LA - VALLE - 1655. Near this is a well and a watering hole for watering grazing cattle, called the "Posso del Loo" and the "Possa del Loo," respectively. About the erection of this stele and the naming of the water deposits the following is what was told by the grandmother of one of the writers, A. Benetti: "In the contrada "Valle della Ba" (Camposilvano) there lived in ancient times a woman named Maddalena. In the contrada there were no wells from which to draw water and so the woman, when she was doing her "lissia" (laundry) would go all the way to the "Posso del Loo" (Wolf's Well). When she had to rinse it required a lot of water and so she preferred to take the "lissia" to the place thus saving a lot of effort. One day the "pora" Maddalena went to the "Posso del Loo" to rinse her laundry and while she was intent on this work, a wolf came out of the woods and ate her. The Wolf ate only the right side of her body, not being able to touch the left side because her heart beats there. After this fact, the Municipality of Velo had the plaque made to remind passersby to say a "requiem for that poor woman." The belief, still widespread in the Camposilvano area, that wolves could not feed on the left side of the human body, certainly arose from this case."

The presence of wolves in Lessinia is still controversial today, as it often divides city public opinion between those who view this presence positively and in favor of the proper maintenance of biodiversity, and those who see the presence of wolves as a major problem because of the large predation on farm animals. In Lessinia, 11 city councils voted unanimously in 2014 on municipal resolutions calling for the total relocation of the predator to other areas and the abandonment of the Life Wolfalps project.

== Art and culture ==
=== Architecture ===
Of particular interest are the small villages, surrounded by their dozens of contrade, comprising from two up to fifty dwellings, in the most mountainous part, above 800 m above sea level. In these contexts, the use of stone by taking advantage of the great availability of such material through quarries, compared to the more scarce availability of construction timber, has given rise to a peculiar feature. The dry-stone walls and the roofs of the houses are composed of stone slabs, reflecting the type of construction of the many huts. The floors of the houses, even after necessary renovations, have often been maintained with stone, with the ever-present fireplace inside and massive wooden beams to support the upper floors.

Stone was, in addition, used for boundary walls, wash houses, and when carved it was transformed into crosses and religious shrines often depicting the Passion of Christ or the Virgin Mary. Also widespread were the icehouses. Now abandoned, the most well-known and well maintained is that of Grietz, circular in shape, on the road connecting Bosco Chiesanuova with San Giorgio.

=== Museums ===
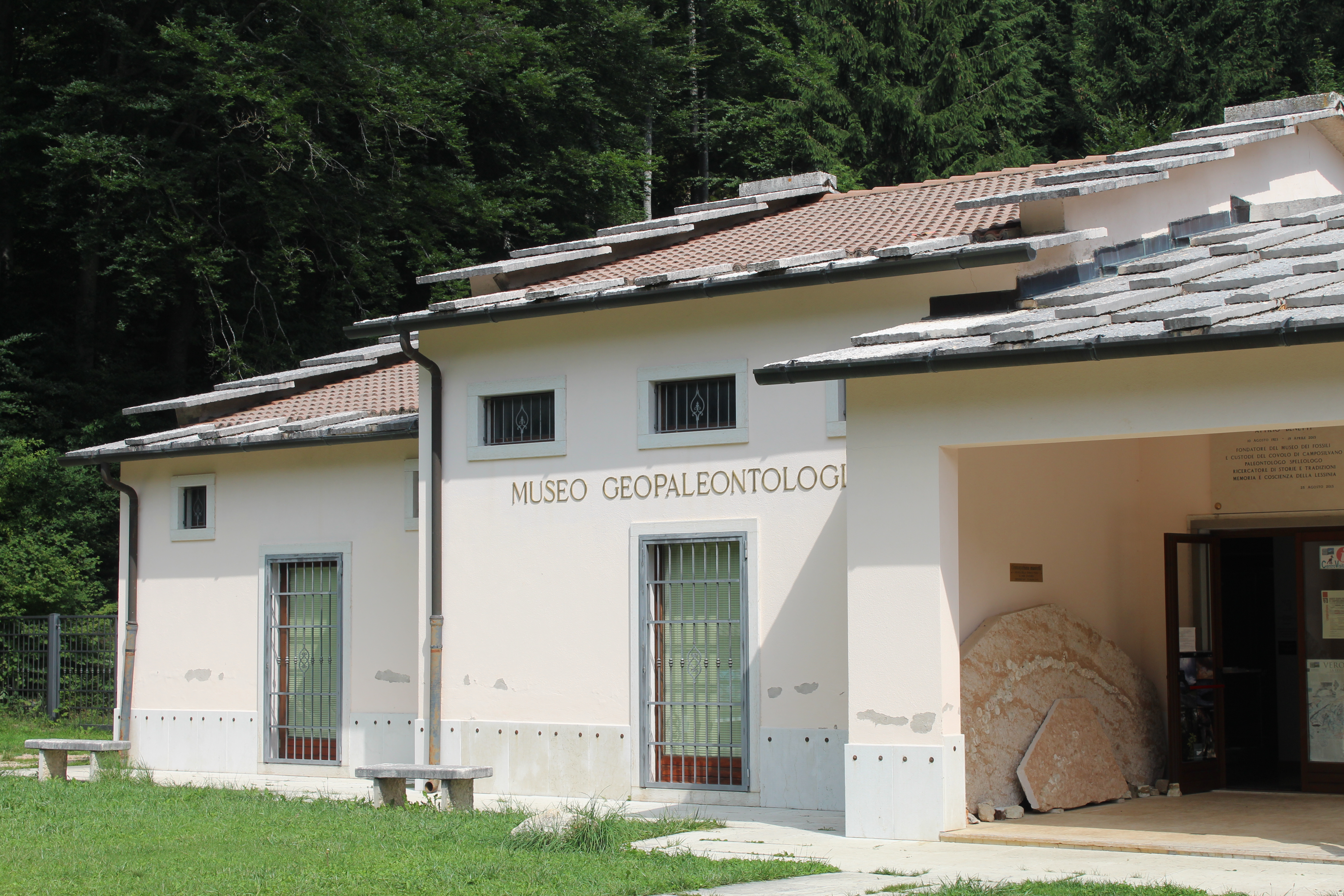
Geopaleontological Museum of Camposilvano

There are several museums in Lessinia, mostly naturalistic ones but with no shortage of ethnographic collections. The Bolca Fossil Museum devotes two rooms to fossil finds of more than 150 species of fish, 250 species of plants, as well as insects and minor fauna. At the Geopaleontological Museum in Camposilvano, fossils from the Mesozoic and Cenozoic periods found both on the plateau and in other regions can be found, thus providing a complete view of the geological and paleontological history of the place. The Paleontological and Prehistoric Museum of Sant'Anna d'Alfaedo displays artifacts found in stone quarries in the area including fossils of fish, sharks, marine reptiles, and ammonites. There is also a section devoted to prehistory with objects found around Fumane. In Molina there is the Lessinia Botanical Museum, which boasts a collection of about 300 herbaceous, shrub and tree species typical of the area. A visit to the museum can be completed with a tour of the nearby Waterfall Park and a visit to the ancient stone courtyards.

The Roncà Fossil Museum, founded in 1975, offers evidence of the environment 40 million years ago such as fossils of foraminifera, mollusks, reptiles, mammals and plants. The Ethnographic Museum in Bosco Chiesanuova aims to illustrate the typical work of the people who once lived in Lessinia, such as wood cutting, charcoal making, milk processing, and ice making. In Giazza, the Museum of the Cimbri offers an exhibit related to the history, culture, and language of the ancient Cimbri. Finally, the Trombini Museum in Selva di Progno displays several types of trombino including a Venetian-made specimen dating back to 1500. Mention should also be made of the Malga Derocon Flora-Fauna Area, in Erbezzo, which allows visitors to observe specimens of chamois, deer, and roe deer in a state of semi-freedom, as well as 60 floristic species of Lessinia, a rock garden and some centuries-old beech trees.

== Economy ==
The economy focuses mainly on animal husbandry, dairy production and the mining and processing of Red Marble and Lessinia Stone.

=== Tourism ===
Tourism in Lessinia is predominantly characterized by tourists from neighboring areas (especially the cities of Verona and Mantua).

== Landmarks and places of interest ==
=== Religious architecture ===
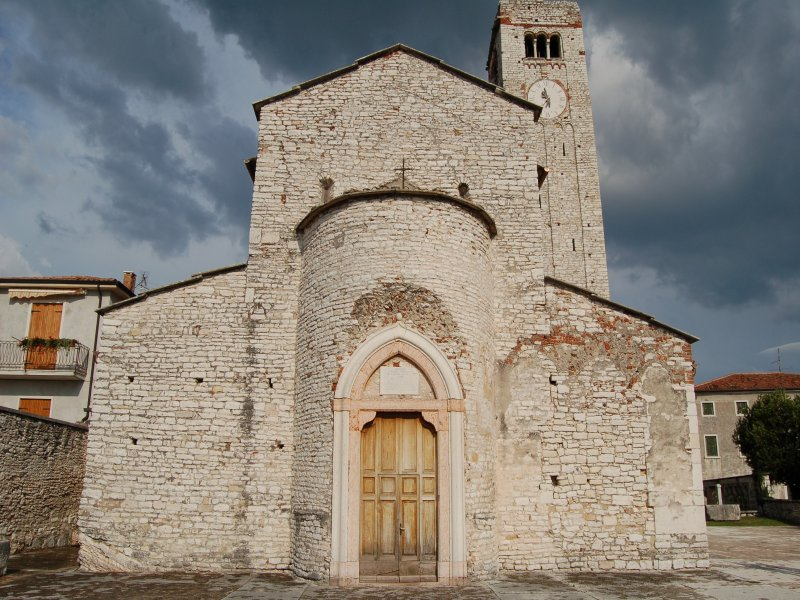
Parish church of San Giorgio di Valpolicella

- Parish church of San Giorgio di Valpolicella, in San Giorgio of Sant'Ambrogio di Valpolicella. Built on an earlier Lombard temple, of which there is still an interesting ciborium, the Romanesque building was erected in the 11th century. In the Middle Ages it housed a college of priests and a seminary.
- Church of San Leonardo on Mount Moro, in San Mauro di Saline. The present building was built in 1388 on an earlier small church, probably destroyed by fire adjoining a monastery of which, in 1145, the prior was a certain Lanfranco. Outside, on the right, is a vast portico used to accommodate the many pilgrims who visited the church. The walls of the naves are adorned with 17th and 18th-century frescoes.
- Church of San Giovanni in Loffa, in Sant'Anna d'Alfaedo. The building is supposed to date from the 13th century, although the first written traces are found only more than a century later.
- Church of St. Anthony, in Vestenavecchia (VR). It was erected by the bishops in the late 13th century on the ruins of the castle (and with materials from it) and was dedicated to St. Anthony the Abbot. The church was remodeled on the outside in 1537; in 1650 both the elegant Baroque altar and the apse were erected, which for years guarded an ancient wooden crucifix from the 16th century.

=== Other places of natural and historical interest ===
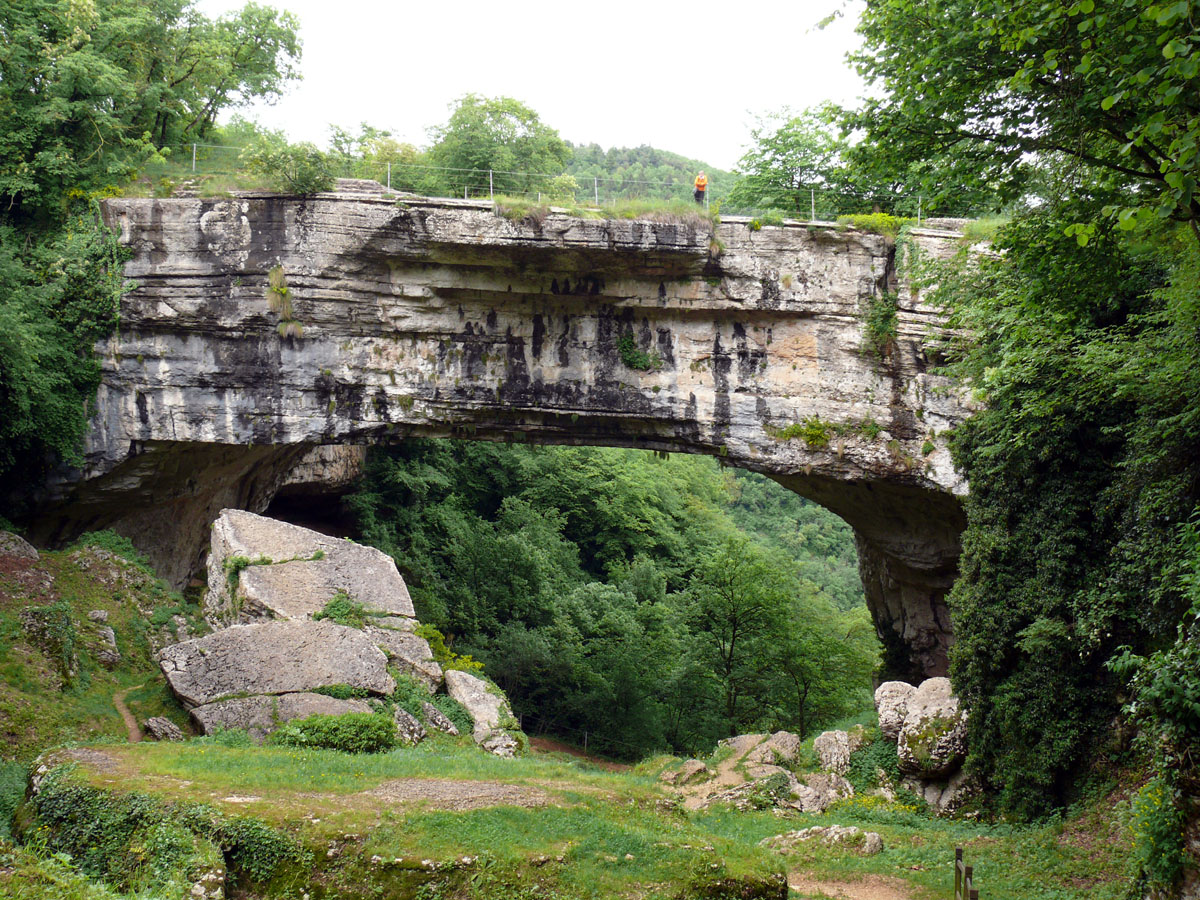
Veja Bridge

- Veja Bridge, in Sant'Anna d'Alfaedo, is a natural arch with an archway of about forty meters, a minimum thickness of nine meters and a width of twenty meters.
- Molina Waterfall Park, in Molina of Fumane, is a nature park famous for its waterfalls.
- Prun Quarries, in Negrar, are ancient underground marble quarries. According to historical sources, these monumental quarries already existed in the early 13th century.
- Riparo Solinas, in Fumane, currently known as Fumane Cave, was inhabited for a very long period ranging from about 60,000 years ago with presences of Homo neanderthalensis until the collapse of the cave allegedly 25,000 years ago as a consequence and effect of glaciation.

== Sports ==
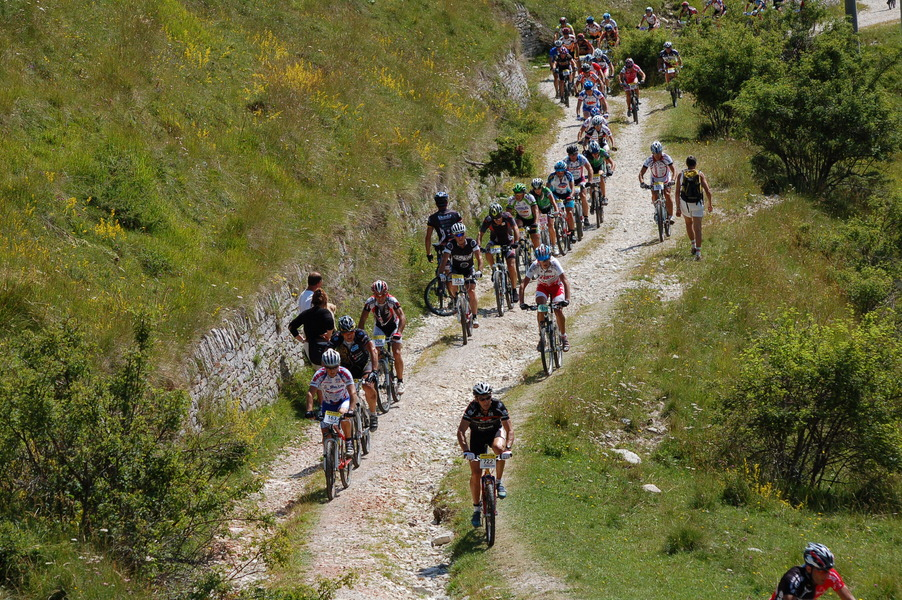
The 2009 edition of Lessinia Bike held annually in these mountains.

The mountains of Lessinia offer numerous opportunities for sportsmen. In the winter period in the area around Malga San Giorgio (locality of Bosco Chiesanuova) there was a ski resort with several ski lifts. Malga San Giorgio is also one of the departures (along with those of Passo delle Fittanze and Bocca di Selva) of the famous Fondo Alta Lessinia center, a cross-country skiing route that winds through the most beautiful corners of the mountain range, reaching altitudes ranging from 1390 to 1755 m.

In summer Lessinia sees the presence of many hikers, and in recent years the presence of mountain bikers has grown considerably. The dirt trails through the alpine pastures have appealed to off-road bicycle enthusiasts. In the areas around Sega di Ala, the Lessinia Bike was held every year, a race in which many athletes competed on a route that passed through the most picturesque places in western Lessinia. The eastern part, on the other hand, is the scene of many editions of another important mountain bike race: the Lessinia Legend. Also important is the presence of racing bike enthusiasts, whose favorite destination is the crossing of the Passo delle Fittanze, particularly the tough climb that starts from Sdruzzinà (Ala).

== See also ==
- Venetian Prealps
- Vicariate of Valpolicella

== Bibliography ==
- Alessandra Aspes (1984). Il Veneto nell'antichità: preistoria e protostoria. Verona: Banca Popolare di Verona.
- Eugenio Turri (2007). La Lessinia. Sommacampagna: Cierre.
- AA.VV. (2014). Lessinia: l'altopiano dei silenzi. Sommacampagna: Cierre.
- Paola Bodini, ed. (2005). Lessinia. Bosco Chiesanuova: Centro turistico giovanile.
- Ugo Sauro, ed. (2017). Cimbri dei Monti Lessini. Gianni Bussinelli.
- Giambattista Pellegrini; Luciano Bosio; Dante Nardo (1976). Il Veneto preromano e romano. Vol. I. Neri Pozza Editore.
- Pietro Piazzola; Giuseppe Rama, eds. (2002). Lessinia, territorio e cultura. Giazza: Curatorium Cimbricum Veronense.
- Eugenio Turri; Vincenzo Pavan; Corrado Balistreri Trincanato (2015). L'architettura di pietra in Lessinia. Percorso nella tradizione architettonica della Lessinia Veronese. Studio 7.
