= Thirteen Communities =

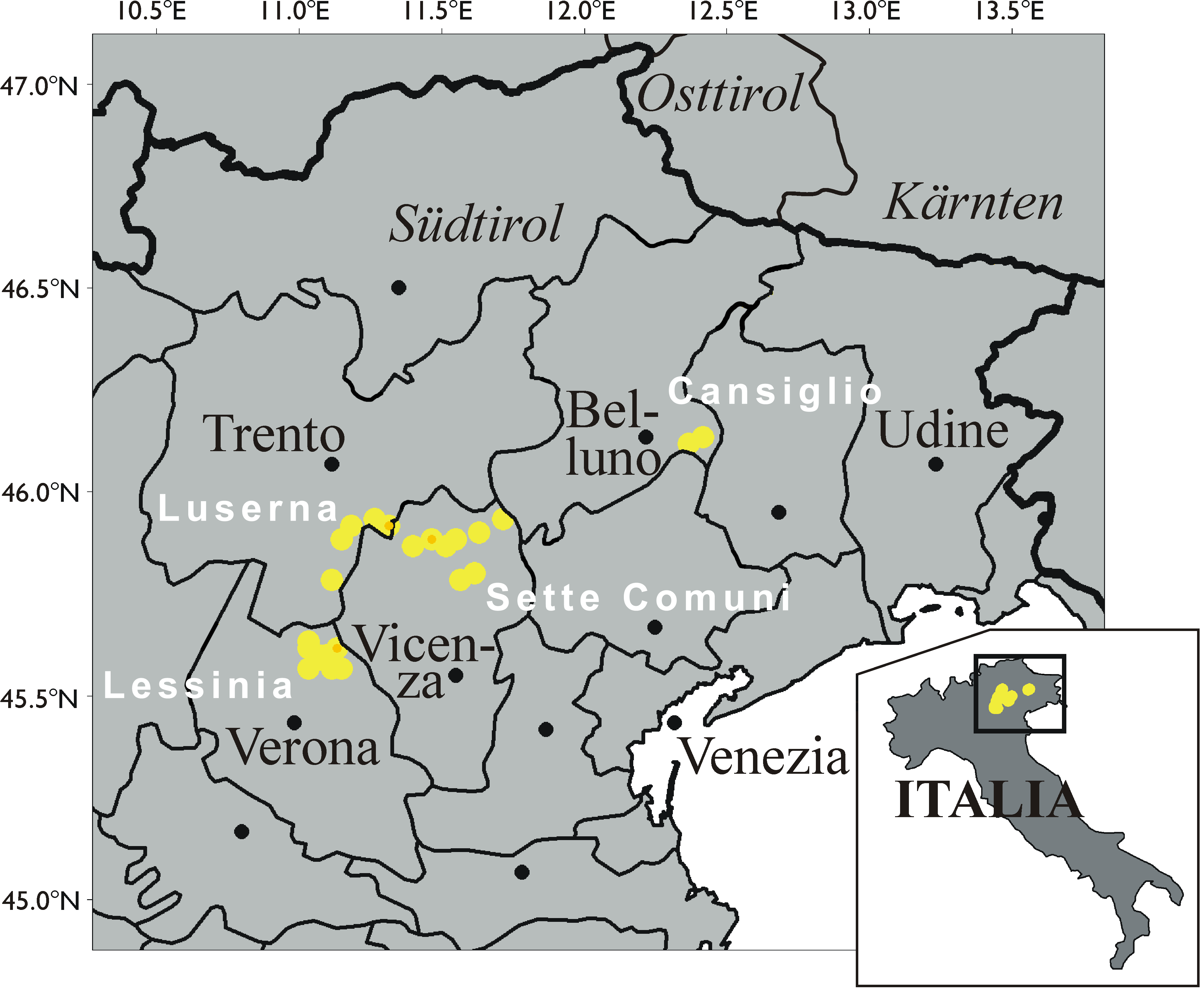
Map of northern Italy showing the location of the Thirteen Communities ("Lessinia")

The Thirteen Communities (Cimbrian: Dreizehn Komoin, German: Dreizehn Gemeinden, Italian: Tredici Comuni) were a group of municipalities in the Veneto region that once primarily spoke the Cimbrian language, a dialect of Upper German, as their native tongue; the dialect is endangered today. The municipalities are located on a high plateau northeast of Verona.

== List ==
1. Vellje
2. Roveràit
3. gen Wiese
4. Brunghe and Ljetzan (a frazione of Brunghe)
5. Nuagankirchen
6. kam' Àbato
7. kame Cire
8. Salàin
9. Asarin (Azzarino), a part of Vellje
10. Bòrtolom (San Bortolo), a frazione of Brunghe
11. Porrental (Val di Porro), frazione of Nuagankirchen
12. Tavernole, a frazione of San Mauro di Saline
13. Kampsilvan (Camposilvano), a frazione of Vellje

== History ==
The thirteen communities formed together into a loose commonwealth around 1280. They were historically under the suzerainty of the Milanese House of Visconti and then under the Republic of Venice. Under both they enjoyed wide cultural and political autonomy in exchange for their loyalty. The autonomous status came to an end with the Napoleonic Wars and the demise of the Serenìssima in 1797.

Due to the high pressure to Italianize from Fascists such as Ettore Tolomei and the government of Benito Mussolini, the Cimbrian language eventually almost completely disappeared and nearly became extinct. Only in Ljetzan has Cimbrian partly survived.

Ljetzan has the cultural institute "Tautsche Püachar Haus" and ethnological museum which is a repository of the Cimbrian culture and cooperates with other linguistic enclaves in Luserna and the Seven Communities. Vestiges of the once dominant language can be found in some place names.

== Example ==
The Cimbrian that was spoken in the Thirteen Communities was a slightly different dialect from Cimbrian spoken elsewhere.

Cimbrian

Vatar usar
ta Do pist ime Himmel,
gaholagat sait Dai name.
Kime Daine Raich.

German

Vater unser
der Du bist im Himmel,
geheiligt werde Dein Name.
Dein Reich komme.

English

Our Father
who are in heaven,
hallowed be your name.
Your kingdom come,

== See also ==
- Sette Comuni
