= SD Cinematografica =

Production company, based in Roma

- Type: Privately held company
- Industry: Television
- Genre: Production company
- Founded: 1981
- Founder: Giuseppe Dall'Angelo; Elsa Dossi
- Headquarters: Roma, Italy
- Key people: Roberto Dall'Angelo, CEO; Ilaria Milanti, Vice-president; Alessio Zanardo, Sales manager
- Products: documentary films
- Number of employees: 5
- Website: www.sdcinematografica.com

SD Cinematografica was formed in 1981 as a production company, based in Roma. The founders are Giuseppe Dall'Angelo and Elsa Dossi. Since 2000, the company is controlled by Roberto Dall'Angelo, acting as CEO and President of the company.

== Area of business ==
Since its founding, the company has produced Films, Variety shows, and Science and Cultural documentaries for the Italian public broadcaster RAI and other leading international television channels. In recent years the company has focused on wildlife, Science and History documentaries with such success that it now counts National Geographic Channel, Discovery Channel, TF1, ARTE, NHK, RTSI, ARD, PBS, ZDF as well as RAI and Mediaset, among its clients.

In 2006, an independent division was created in order to distribute Italian documentary content all around the world.

SD Cinematografica also offers a range of services in the areas of shooting, audio and video post-production and duplication.

== Awards and Prizes ==
Many SD documentaries have won major international prizes at the world's leading festivals, including Academy Award, Emmy award and Banff World Television Festival nominations.

== Recent productions ==
- The ghosts of the Third Reich (47 min.)
- On the trails of the glaciers (52 min.)
- Free Mussolini (120 min.)
- The battle of Monte Cassino: the shocking truth (52 min.)
- Trieste: a ring on the Adriatic (52 min.)
- Blue jeans and short skirts (52 min.)
- Ortona 1943: a bloody Christmas (52 min.)
  - Banff World Television Festival nominee (Canada 2008)
- Animals A to Z (38 x 8 min.)
  - 1° Prize at the Cinema, Nature and Environment Film Festival (Italy 2006)
- The sinking of the Andrea Doria (75 min.)
  - PBS submission at Emmy Awards (USA 2007)
- Flying over Everest (60 min. e 2 x 45 min.)
  - 1° prize at the Chamois international film festival (Italy 2004)
  - Prix de l'exploit at the St. Hilarie - Coupe Icaro Film festival (France 2004)
  - 1° prize at the Festival internazionale del cinema naturalistico e ambientale - Teramo (Italy 2004)
  - Prize by the Politecnico di Bari during the Catellana Grotte International film festival (Italy 2005)
  - “Sport Estreme” prize at the Moscow Filmfestival (Russia 2005)
  - “Best adventure Film” prize at the Wildsouth Film Award (New Zealand 2005)
  - “Silver Screen” prize at the US International Film and Video Festival (USA 2005)
  - “Best adventure Film” prize at the Mountainfilm in Telluride (USA 2005)
  - Special prize at the Cervino International Film Festival (Italy 2005)
  - 1° prize in the category “man and mountain” at the Film Festival Teplice nad Metujì (Czech Republic 2005)
  - Special prize at the Jonio International Film Festival (Italy 2005)
  - Special prize at the Festival International du film d’aventure de Dijon (France 2005)
  - 1° Prize at the Montreal International Adventure Film Festival (Canada 2005)
  - Special prize at the Sport Movies & TV 2005 (Italy 2005)
  - “Most Inspiring Adventure Film” prize at the Wild Scenic Environmental Film Festival (USA 2006)
  - 1° Prize “Leggimontagna” (Italy 2006)
  - Special prize at the Festival Internazionale del documentario ornitologico (Italy 2006)
  - Special prize at the Festival Internazionale Cine de Cantabria – Santander (Spain 2006)
- The mystery of the wolf(52 min.)
  - Special prize at the International Festival Bergfilm in Tegersee (Germany 2004)
  - Special prize at the International Festival of Lessinia (Italy 2004)
  - "Best italian documentary" prize at the “Stambecco d’oro” Festival in Cogne (Italy 2005)
- Hunting for 'Ngotto (52 min.)

== Press (in Italian language) ==
- Italia Oggi 23.7.2003
- La Repubblica 20.12.2003
- La Repubblica 19.2.2005
- Il Piccolo 12.4.2007
- Il Piccolo 22.1.2008
- Il Piccolo 27.3.2009
- Il Centro 17.12.2009
- Il Piccolo 27.12.2009
- Il Piccolo 6.3.2010
- Corriere del Mezzogiorno 1.12.2010
- La Repubblica 1.12.2010
