= Monte Pastello =

Mountain in Italy

Coordinates: 45°35′09″N 10°52′02″E

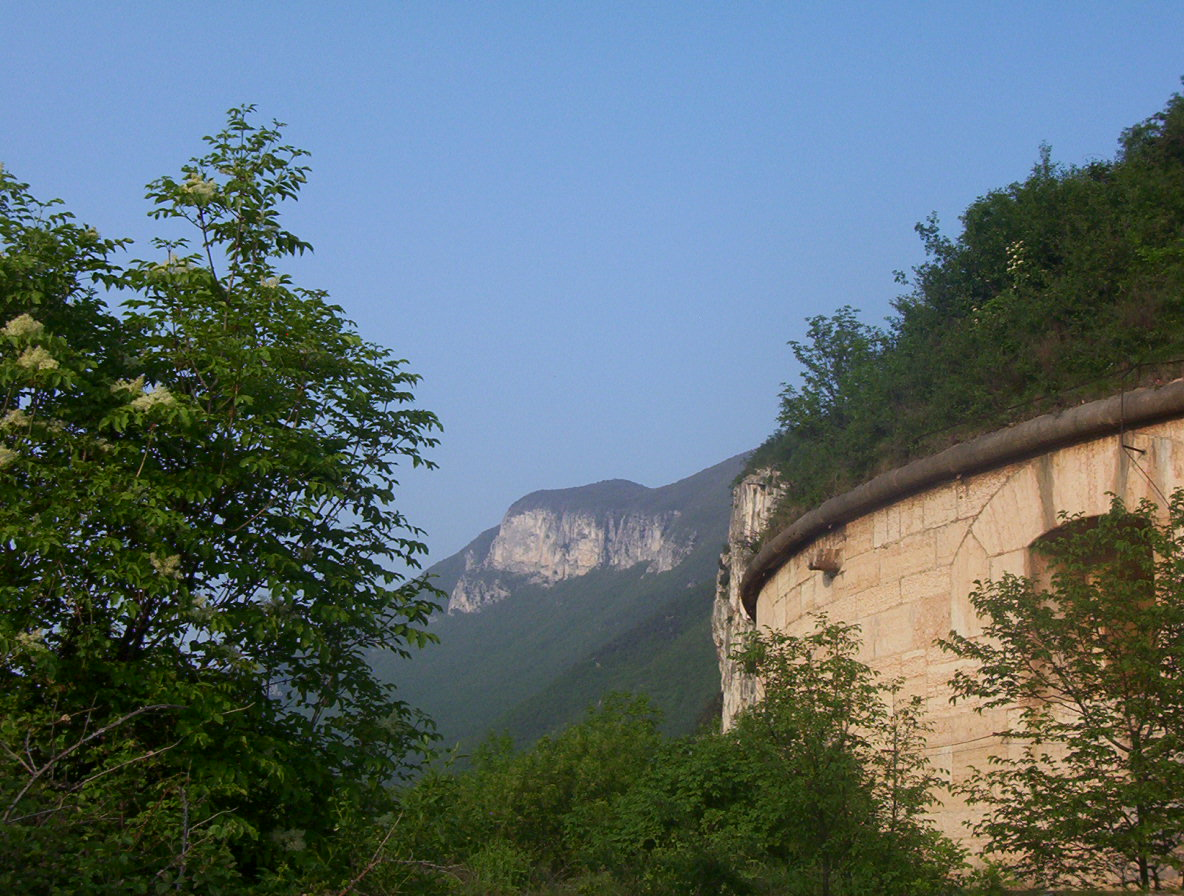

Highest point
- Elevation: 1,128 m (3,701 ft)

Geography
- Location: Veneto, Italy

Monte Pastello is a mountain of the Veneto, Italy. The mountain, which has an elevation of 1,128 metres, is part of the Monti Lessini in the Venetian Prealps. It is located in the Province of Verona.
