= Marano di Valpolicella =

- Comune
- Comune di Marano di Valpolicella
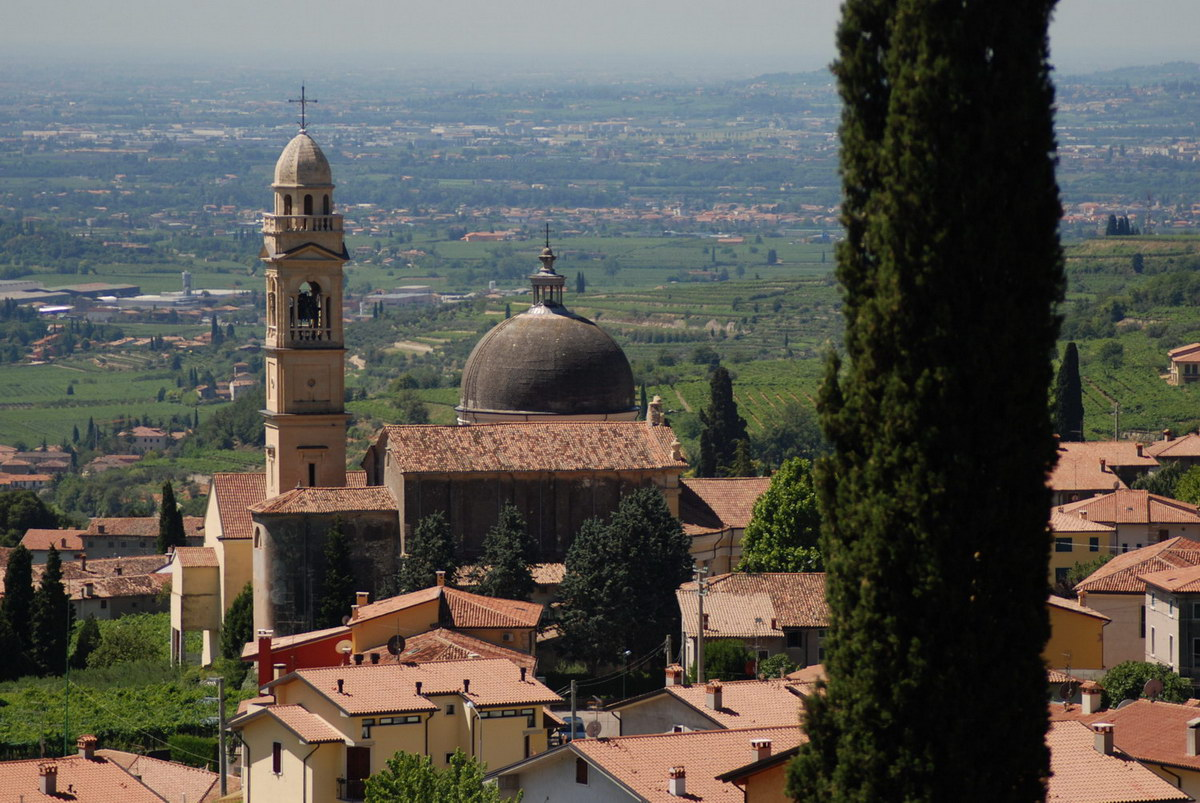

- Location within Italy Location within Veneto
- Coordinates: 45°33′N 10°55′E
- Country: Italy
- Region: Veneto
- Province: Province of Verona (VR)
- Frazioni: Valgatara e San Rocco

Area
  - Total: 18.6 km^{2} (7.2 sq mi)
- Elevation: 318 m (1,043 ft)

Population (Dec. 2004)
  - Total: 2,975
  - Density: 160/km^{2} (414/sq mi)
- Demonym: Maranesi
- Time zone: UTC+1 (CET)
  - Summer (DST): UTC+2 (CEST)
- Postal code: 37020
- Dialing code: 045
- Website: Official website

Marano di Valpolicella is a comune (municipality) in the Province of Verona in the Italian region Veneto, located about 110 kilometres (68 mi) west of Venice and about 14 kilometres (9 mi) northwest of Verona. As of 31 December 2004, it had a population of 2,975 and an area of 18.6 square kilometres (7.2 mi^{2}).

The municipality of Marano di Valpolicella contains the frazione (subdivision) Valgatara e San Rocco.

Marano di Valpolicella borders the following municipalities: Fumane, Negrar, San Pietro in Cariano, and Sant'Anna d'Alfaedo.

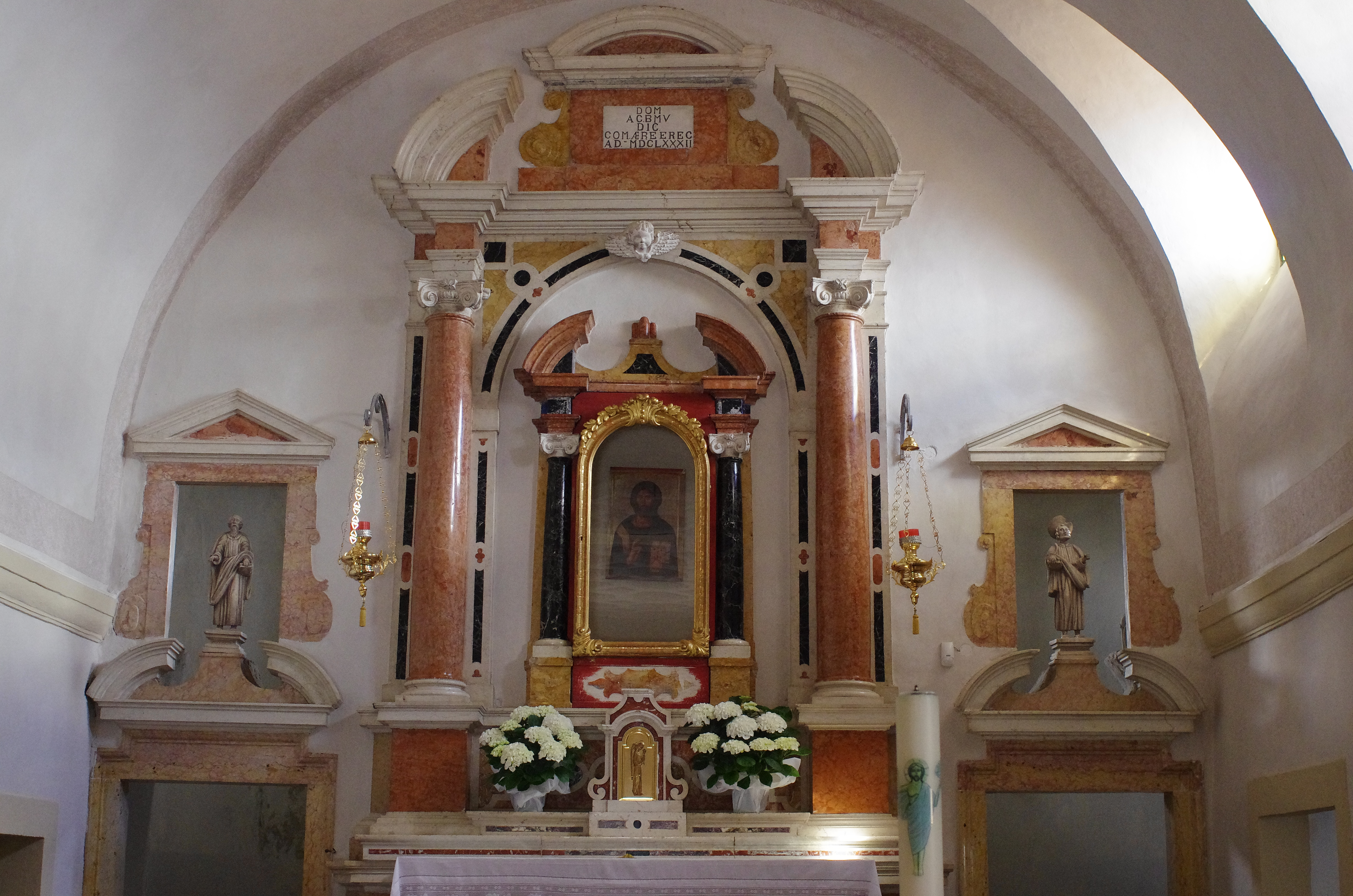
Santuario di Maria Valverde's main altar at Marano di Valpolicella.

== Demographic evolution ==
Historical population

| Year | Pop. | ±% |
|---|---|---|
| 1861 | ? | — |
| 1871 | 1,986 | — |
| 1881 | 2,181 | +9.8% |
| 1901 | 2,486 | +14.0% |
| 1911 | 2,754 | +10.8% |

| Year | Pop. | ±% |
|---|---|---|
| 1921 | 2,869 | +4.2% |
| 1931 | 2,989 | +4.2% |
| 1936 | 2,963 | −0.9% |
| 1951 | 3,164 | +6.8% |
| 1961 | 2,761 | −12.7% |

| Year | Pop. | ±% |
|---|---|---|
| 1971 | 2,472 | −10.5% |
| 1981 | 2,475 | +0.1% |
| 1991 | 2,538 | +2.5% |
| 2001 | 2,897 | +14.1% |

Source: Data from ISTAT

== Twin towns ==
Marano di Valpolicella is twinned with:

- Appenheim, Germany, since 2003
