= San Mauro di Saline =

- Comune
- Comune di San Mauro di Saline
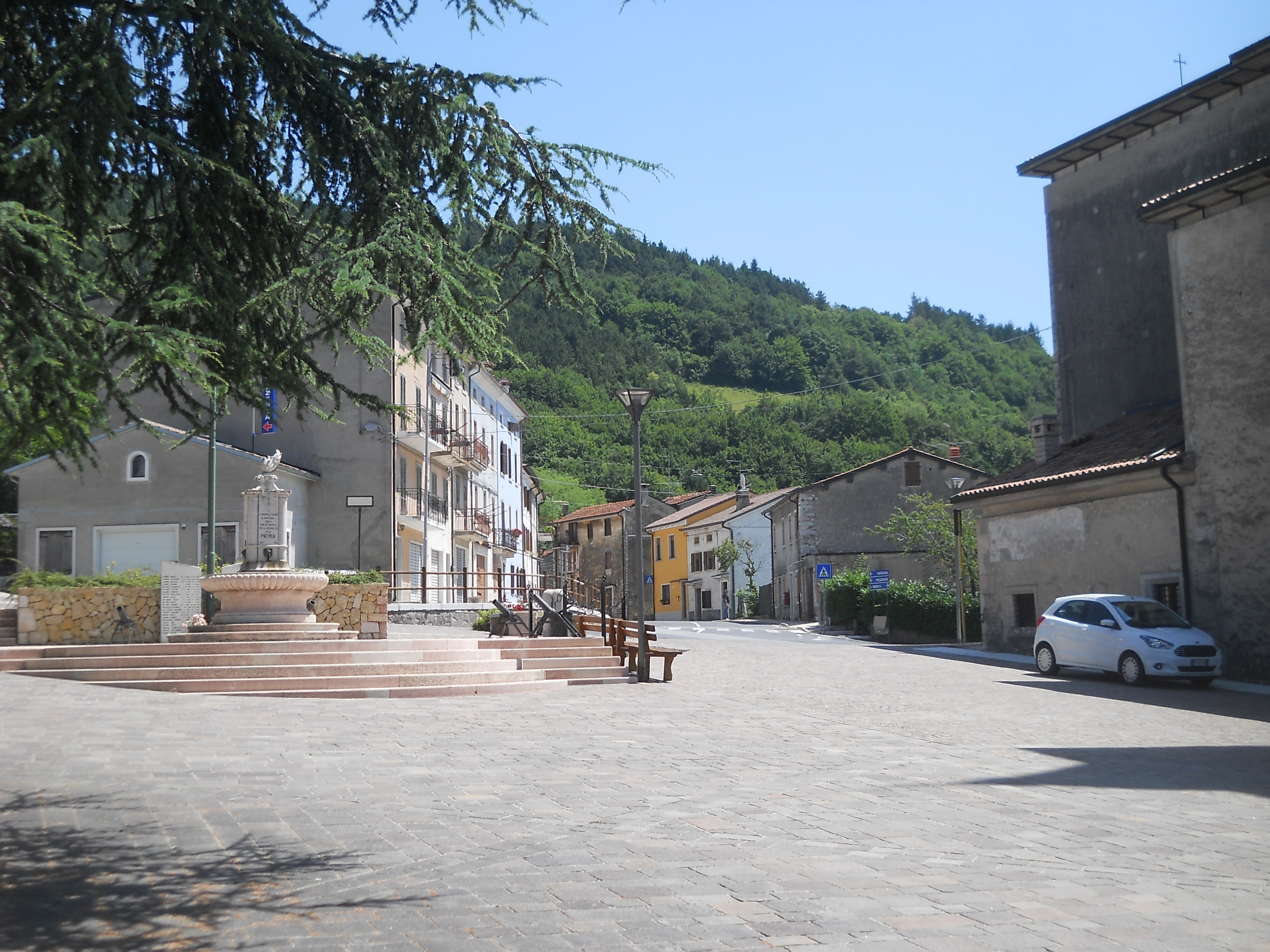

- Location within Italy Location within Veneto
- Coordinates: 45°34′N 11°7′E
- Country: Italy
- Region: Veneto
- Province: Verona (VR)
- Frazioni: Saline e Tavernole

Government
  - Mayor: Italo Bonomi

Area
  - Total: 11.1 km^{2} (4.3 sq mi)
- Elevation: 804 m (2,638 ft)

Population (31 May 2016)
  - Total: 577
  - Density: 52.0/km^{2} (135/sq mi)
- Demonym: Salinesi
- Time zone: UTC+1 (CET)
  - Summer (DST): UTC+2 (CEST)
- Postal code: 37030
- Dialing code: 045
- Website: Official website

San Mauro di Saline (Cimbrian: Salàin; German: Sankt Moritz; Venetian: Sałine) is a comune (municipality) in the Province of Verona in the Italian region Veneto, located about 90 kilometres (56 mi) west of Venice and about 20 kilometres (12 mi) northeast of Verona. It is part of the Thirteen Communities, a group of villages which historically speak the Cimbrian language.

San Mauro di Saline borders the following municipalities: Badia Calavena, Roverè Veronese, Tregnago, Velo Veronese, and Verona. Sights include the 14th century church of San Leonardo.
