= Erbezzo =

- Comune
- Comune di Erbezzo
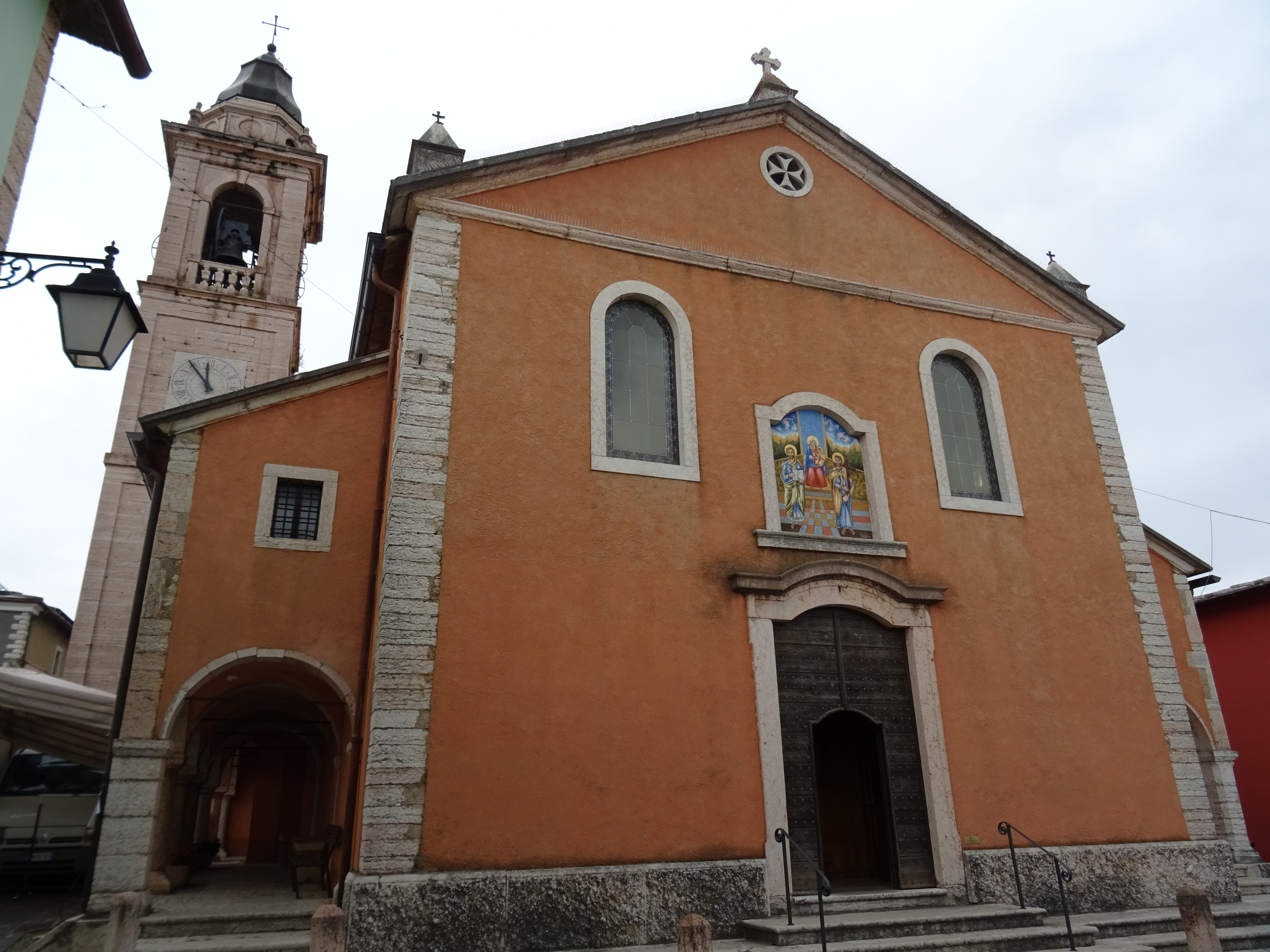
- Santi Filippo e Giacomo church

- Location within Italy Location within Veneto
- Coordinates: 45°38′N 11°2′E
- Country: Italy
- Region: Veneto
- Province: Verona (VR)

Area
  - Total: 32.4 km^{2} (12.5 sq mi)
- Elevation: 1,118 m (3,668 ft)

Population (30 November 2024)
  - Total: 856
  - Density: 26.4/km^{2} (68.4/sq mi)
- Demonym: Erbezzini
- Time zone: UTC+1 (CET)
  - Summer (DST): UTC+2 (CEST)
- Postal code: 37020
- Dialing code: 045
- Website: Official website

Erbezzo (Cimbrian: gen Wiese) is a comune (municipality) in the province of Verona in the Italian region Veneto, located about 100 kilometres (62 mi) west of Venice and about 25 kilometres (16 mi) north of Verona. It is part of the Thirteen Communities, a group of villages which historically primarily speak the Cimbrian language.

Erbezzo borders the following municipalities: Ala, Bosco Chiesanuova, Grezzana, and Sant'Anna d'Alfaedo.
