= Sant'Anna d'Alfaedo =

Sant'Anna d'Alfaedo VERONA-VENETO
- Comune
- Comune di Sant'Anna d'Alfaedo
- Location within Italy Location within Veneto
- Coordinates: 45°38′N 10°57′E
- Country: Italy
- Region: Veneto
- Province: Province of Verona (VR)
- Frazioni: Ronconi, Fosse, Giare, Cerna, Sant'Anna, Ceredo

Area
  - Total: 43.7 km^{2} (16.9 sq mi)
- Elevation: 939 m (3,081 ft)

Population (Dec. 2004)
  - Total: 2,544
  - Density: 58.2/km^{2} (151/sq mi)
- Demonym: Faetini
- Time zone: UTC+1 (CET)
  - Summer (DST): UTC+2 (CEST)
- Postal code: 37020
- Dialing code: 0823
- Website: Official website

Sant'Anna d'Alfaedo is a comune (municipality) in the Province of Verona in the Italian region Veneto, located about 110 kilometres (68 mi) west of Venice and about 20 kilometres (12 mi) north of Verona. As of 31 December 2004, it had a population of 2,544 and an area of 43.7 square kilometres (16.9 mi^{2}).

The municipality of Sant'Anna d'Alfaedo contains the frazioni (subdivisions, mainly villages and hamlets) Ronconi, Fosse, Giare, Cerna, Sant'Anna, and Ceredo.

Sant'Anna d'Alfaedo borders the following municipalities: Ala, Avio, Dolcè, Erbezzo, Fumane, Grezzana, Marano di Valpolicella, and Negrar.

== Demographic evolution ==
Historical population

Year	Pop.	±%
1861	?	—
1871	2,491	—
1881	2,674	+7.3%
1901	3,224	+20.6%
1911	3,227	+0.1%

Year	Pop.	±%
1921	3,425	+6.1%
1931	3,316	−3.2%
1936	3,251	−2.0%
1951	3,308	+1.8%
1961	2,845	−14.0%

Year	Pop.	±%
1971	2,439	−14.3%
1981	2,452	+0.5%
1991	2,483	+1.3%
2001	2,462	−0.8%

Source: Data from ISTAT
