= Roveré Veronese =

- Comune
- Comune di Roveré Veronese
- Location within Italy Location within Veneto
- Coordinates: 45°36′N 11°4′E
- Country: Italy
- Region: Veneto
- Province: Verona (VR)
- Frazioni: Roverè, San Francesco, San Vitale, San Rocco di Piegara

Government
  - Mayor: Alessandra Caterina Ravelli

Area
  - Total: 36.5 km^{2} (14.1 sq mi)
- Elevation: 843 m (2,766 ft)

Population (31 December 2015)
  - Total: 2,115
  - Density: 57.9/km^{2} (150/sq mi)
- Demonym: Roveresi
- Time zone: UTC+1 (CET)
  - Summer (DST): UTC+2 (CEST)
- Postal code: 37028
- Dialing code: 045
- Website: Official website

Roveré Veronese (Cimbrian: Roveràit) is a comune (municipality) in the Province of Verona in the Italian region Veneto, located about 100 kilometres (62 mi) west of Venice and about 20 kilometres (12 mi) northeast of Verona. It is part of the Thirteen Communities, a group of villages where the population historically speaks the Cimbrian language, a dialect of Upper German, as their native tongue.

Roverè Veronese borders the following municipalities: Bosco Chiesanuova, Cerro Veronese, Grezzana, San Mauro di Saline, Selva di Progno, Velo Veronese, and Verona.
