= Giazza =

Giazza Ljetzan (Cimbrian) Jassa (Western Venetian)
- Frazione
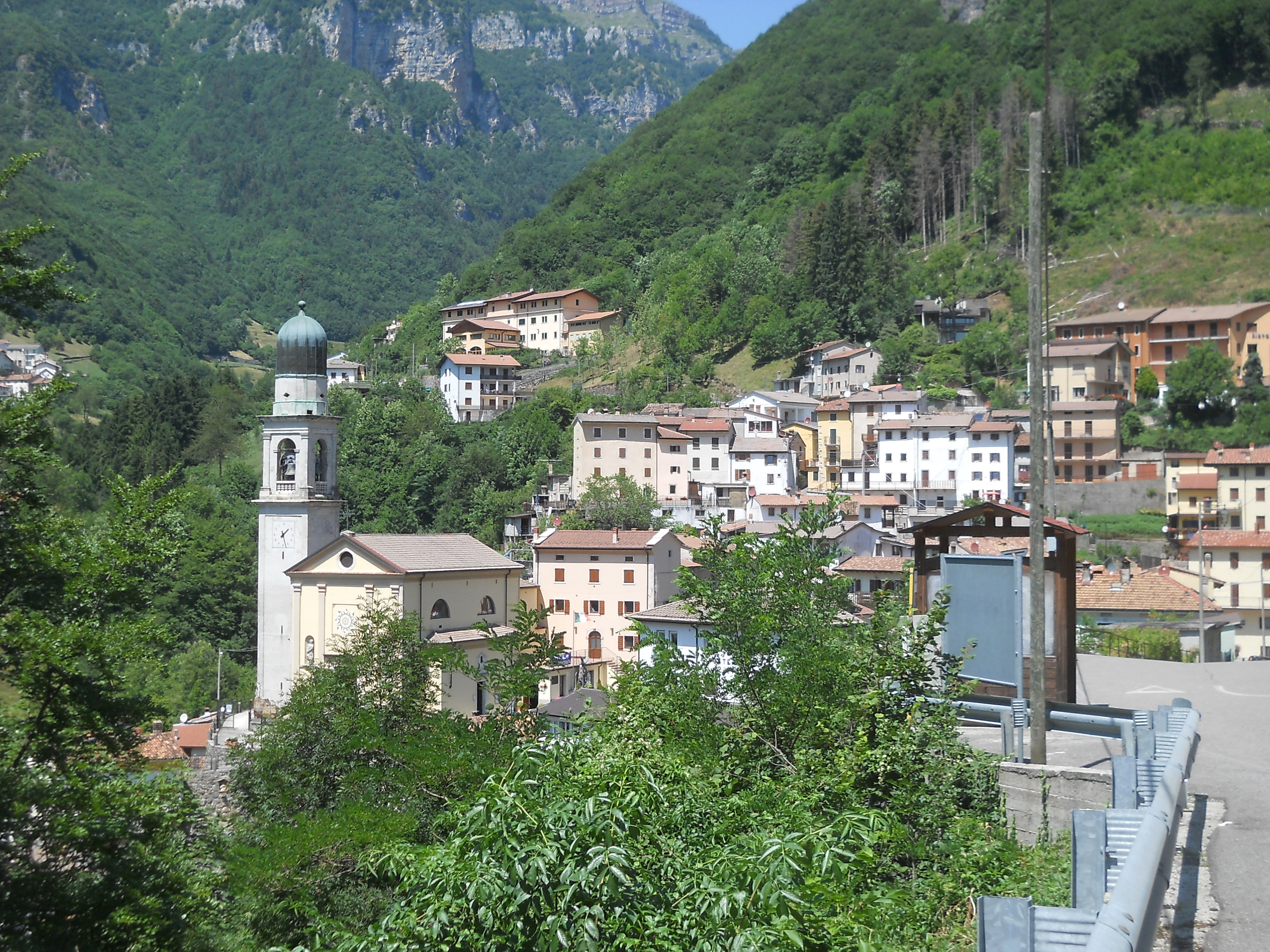

- Location of Giazza in Italy
- Coordinates: 45°39′N 11°7′E
- Country: Italy
- Region: Veneto
- Province: Verona (VR)
- Comune: Selva di Progno
- Elevation: 758 m (2,487 ft)

Population
  - Total: 133
- Time zone: UTC+1 (CET)
  - Summer (DST): UTC+2 (CEST)
- Postal code: 37030
- Dialing code: 045
- Website: Official website

The town Giazza (Cimbrian: Ljetzan, Venetian: Jassa, Venetian pronunciation: ['jasa] (Note: Until a few decades ago, the pronunciation Jatha /'jaθa/ was widespread, with the interdental phoneme /θ/ instead of /s/, cf. Volpato, Giancarlo (1983). Civiltà cimbra. La cultura dei Cimbri dei Tredici Comuni veronesi. Verona: Bi & Gi. p. 73.)) is a frazione of the comune of Selva di Progno, in the Province of Verona.

== Geography ==
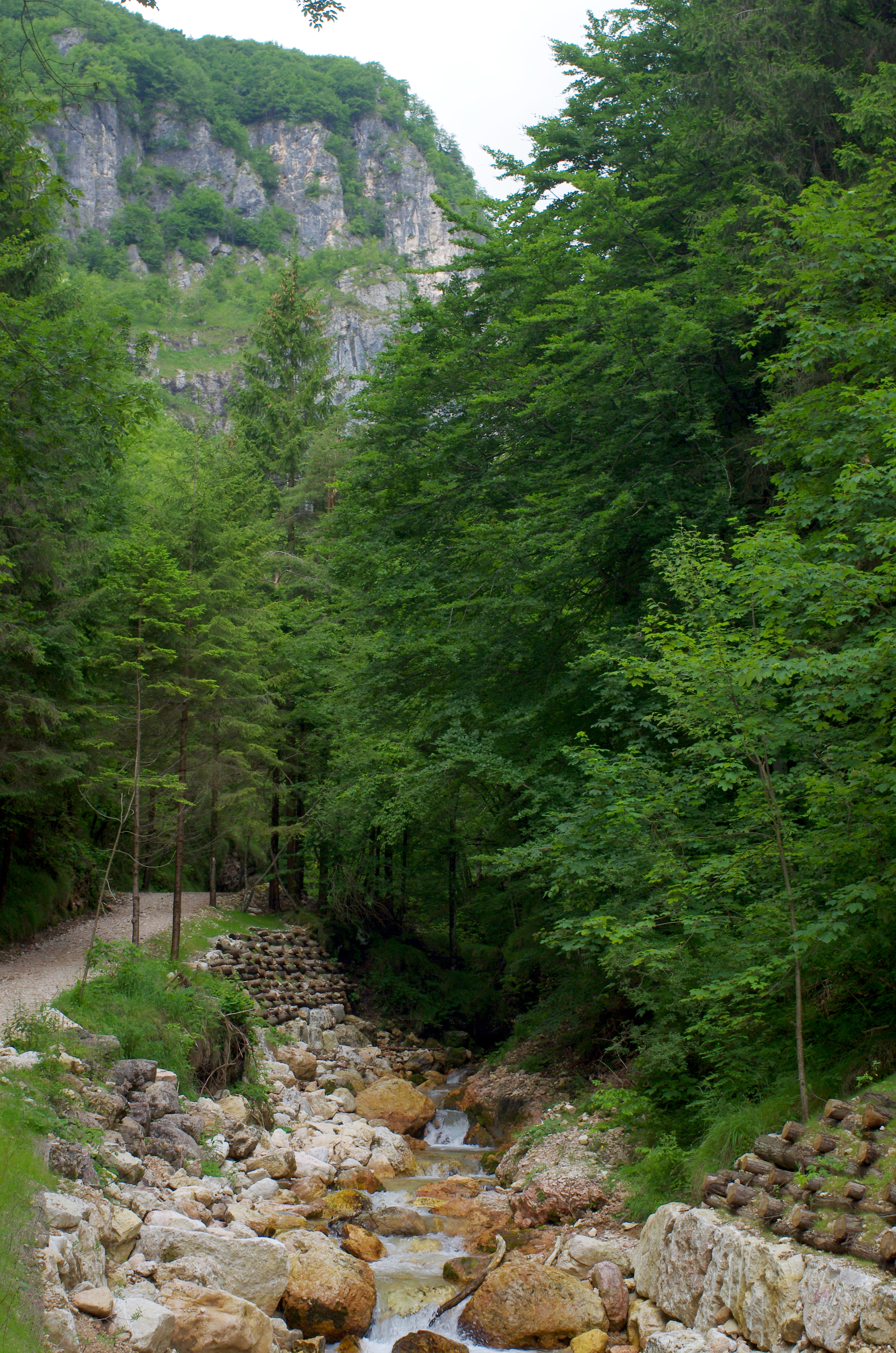
A view of Valle di Fraselle

The town is located at the confluence of the Revolto and Fraselle rivers, and just below the mountain Gruppo della Carega.

== Language and dialects ==
Giazza is the last of the ancient Thirteen Communities in which Cimbrian language is still spoken.

Today the Cimbrian language is falling out of use. According to the most recent data only 19 inhabitants speak the language and only 24 can understand it.

== Culture ==
=== Events ===
- Festa del fuoco (trans. The Festival of Fire) (23 June) – A festival of pagan origins in which the community celebrates its history as part of the 13 communities.
