= Velo Veronese =

- Comune
- Comune di Velo Veronese
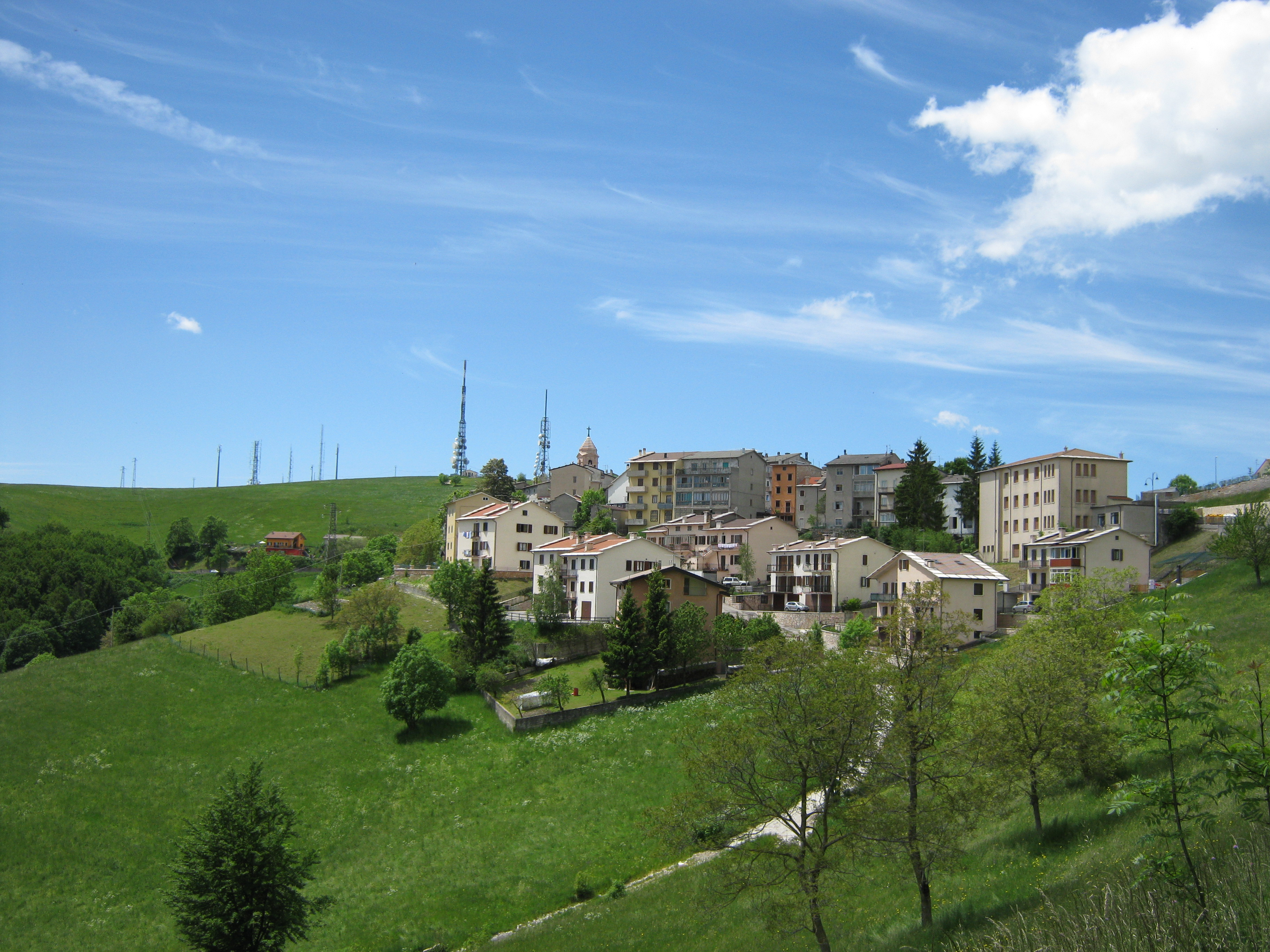

- Location within Italy Location within Veneto
- Coordinates: 45°36′N 11°6′E
- Country: Italy
- Region: Veneto
- Province: Verona (VR)
- Frazioni: Camposilvano

Government
  - Mayor: Mario Varalta

Area
  - Total: 19.1 km^{2} (7.4 sq mi)
- Elevation: 1,087 m (3,566 ft)

Population (31 December 2015)
  - Total: 770
  - Density: 40/km^{2} (100/sq mi)
- Demonym: Velesi
- Time zone: UTC+1 (CET)
  - Summer (DST): UTC+2 (CEST)
- Postal code: 37030
- Dialing code: 045
- Website: Official website

Velo Veronese (Cimbrian: Vellje; German: Feld) is a comune (municipality) in the Province of Verona in the Italian region Veneto, located about 100 kilometres (62 mi) west of Venice and about 20 kilometres (12 mi) northeast of Verona. It is part of the Thirteen Communities, a group of communities which historically speak the Cimbrian language as their native tongue.

Velo Veronese borders the following municipalities: Badia Calavena, Roverè Veronese, San Mauro di Saline, and Selva di Progno.

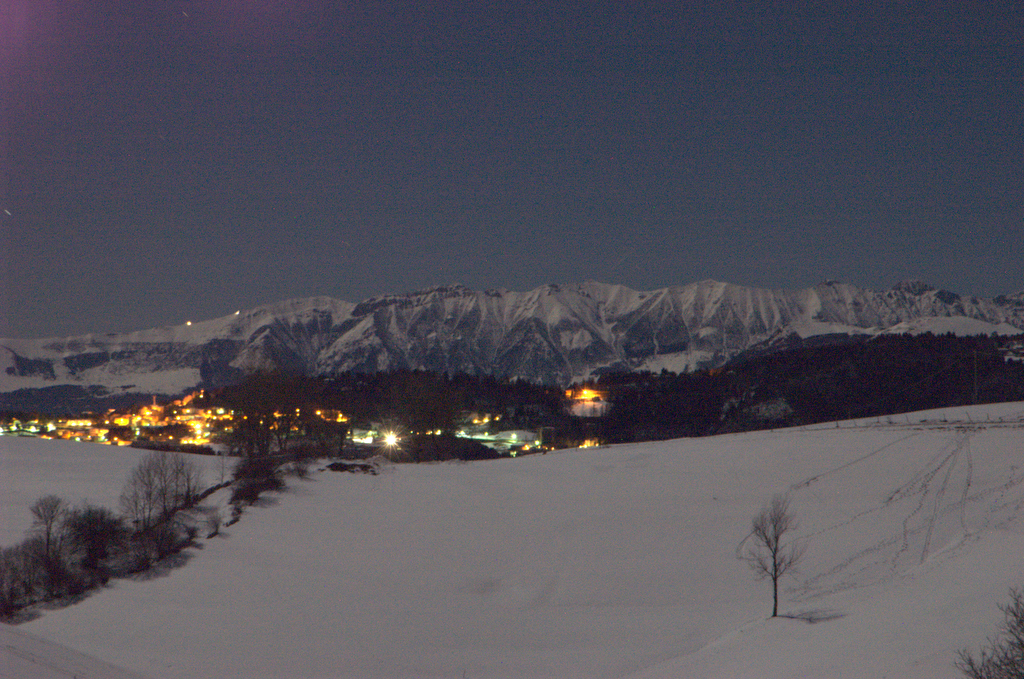
Velo Veronese during winter
