= Gruppo della Carega =

Coordinates: 45°43′26.26″N 11°7′48.32″E

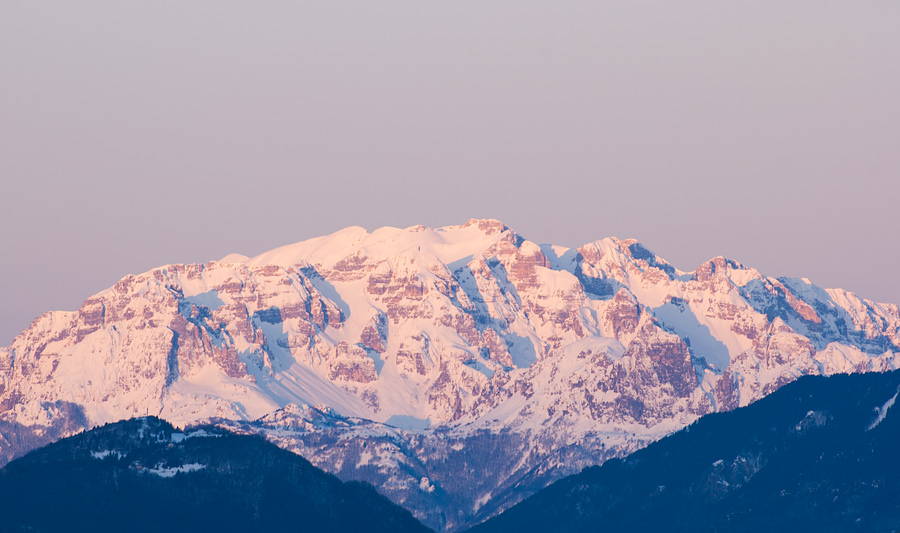

Highest point
- Elevation: 2,259 m (7,411 ft)

Geography
- Location: Veneto, Italy
- Parent range: Venetian Prealps

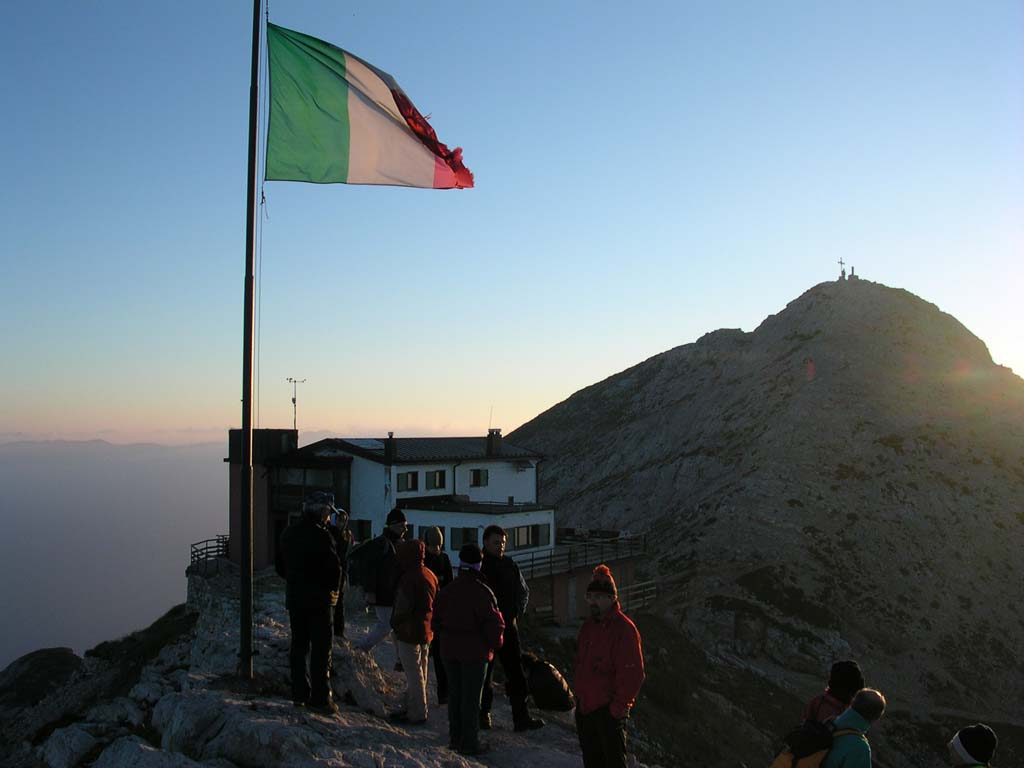
Rifugio Fraccaroli and Cima Carega

Gruppo della Carega is a massif in Veneto, Italy. Its highest peak, Cima Carega, has an elevation of 2,259 metres.
