= Selva di Progno =

- Comune
- Comune di Selva di Progno
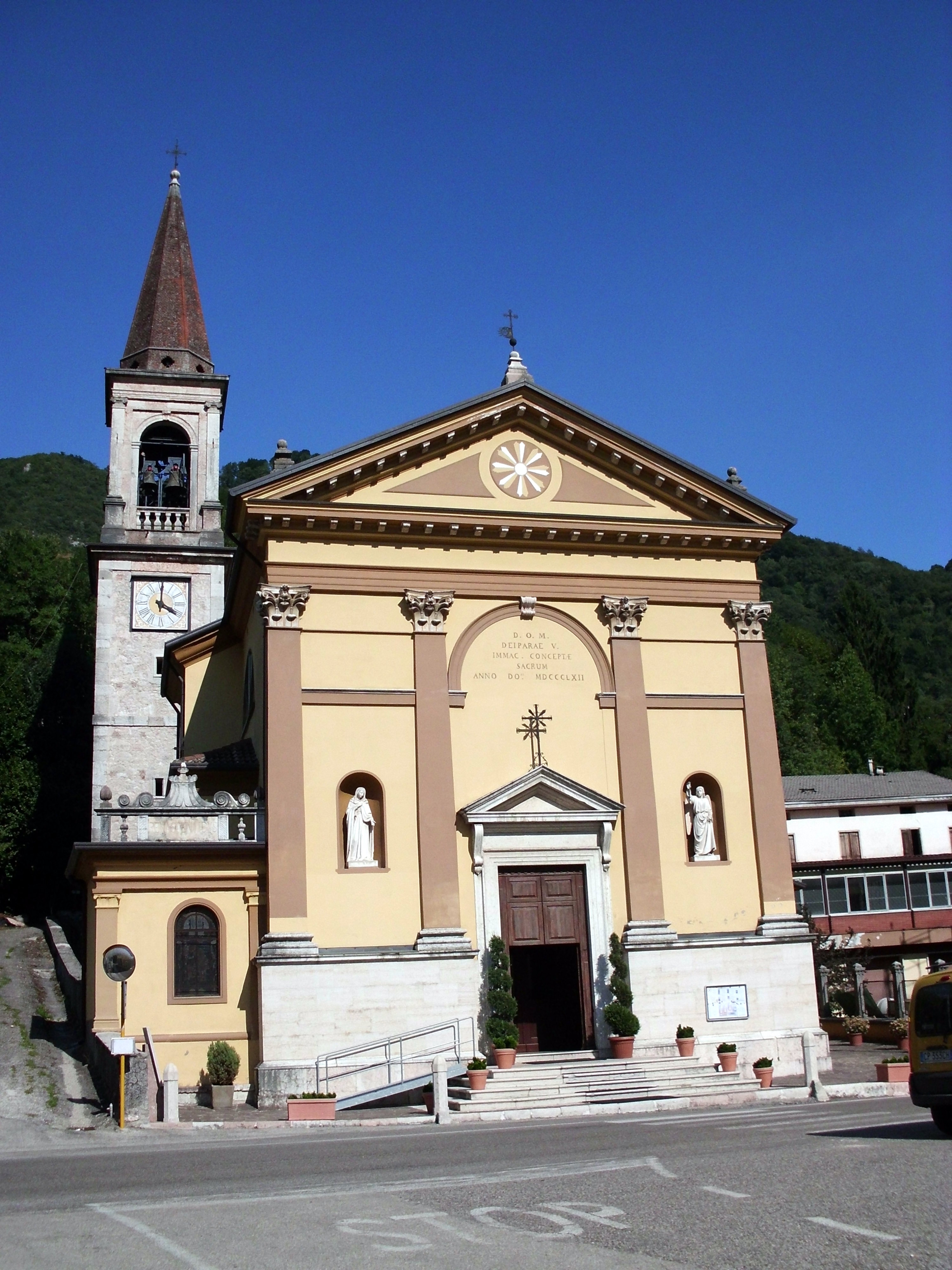

- Location within Italy Location within Veneto
- Coordinates: 45°37′N 11°8′E
- Country: Italy
- Region: Veneto
- Province: Verona (VR)
- Frazioni: Giazza (Ljetzan), Campofontana, San Bartolomeo delle Montagna e San Bortolo

Government
  - Mayor: Aldo Gugole

Area
  - Total: 41.2 km^{2} (15.9 sq mi)
- Elevation: 570 m (1,870 ft)

Population (31 December 2015)
  - Total: 933
  - Density: 22.6/km^{2} (58.7/sq mi)
- Demonym: Selvaprognesi
- Time zone: UTC+1 (CET)
  - Summer (DST): UTC+2 (CEST)
- Postal code: 37030
- Dialing code: 045
- Website: Official website

Selva di Progno (Cimbrian: Brunghe) is a comune (municipality) in the Province of Verona in the Italian region Veneto, located about 90 kilometres (56 mi) west of Venice and about 25 kilometres (16 mi) northeast of Verona.

Selva di Progno borders the following municipalities: Ala, Badia Calavena, Bosco Chiesanuova, Crespadoro, Recoaro Terme, Roverè Veronese, Velo Veronese, and Vestenanova.
