= Vicentine Alps =

Mountain range of the Eastern Alps

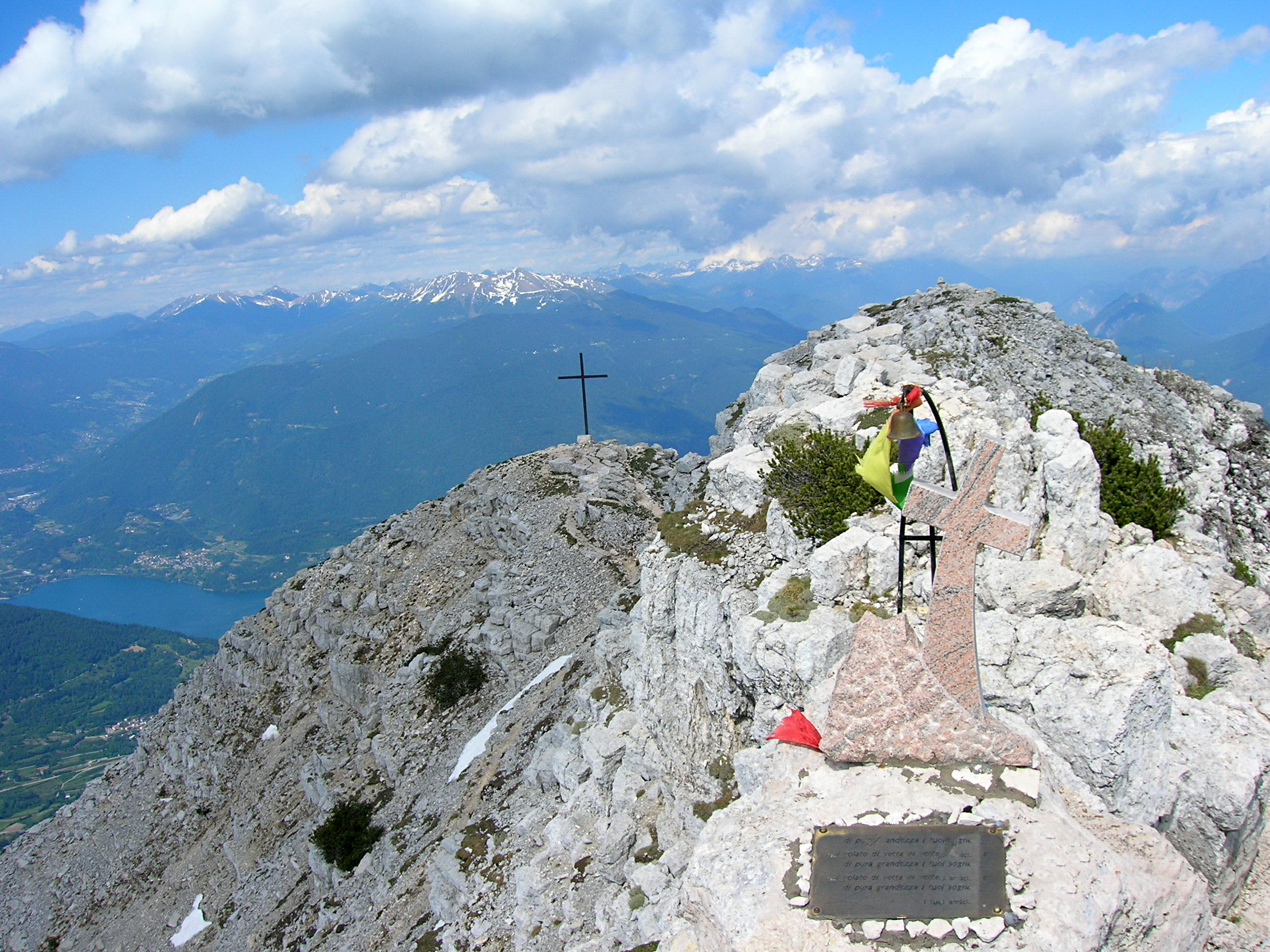
- Summit of the Becco di Filadonna

Highest point
- Peak: Cima Dodici
- Elevation: 2,336 m s.l.m.

Geography
- Location within Alps
- State(s): Trentino, Venetia
- Range coordinates: 45°47′17″N 11°20′19″E
- Parent range: Eastern Alps

The Vicentine Alps (Italian: Prealpi Vicentine; German: Vizentiner Alpen, Vicentiner Alpen or Vizentiner Voralpen) are a mountain range of the Eastern Alps in Trentino and the provinces of Verona and Vicenza. The mountains were named after the city of Vicenza which lies at their eastern edge. The highest point in the range is the Cima Dodici (2,336 m s.l.m.) on the northern perimeter of the Vicentine Alps.

== Boundaries ==
The Alpine Club classification of the Eastern Alps (AVE) bounds the Vicentine Alps as follows: In the west the Adige marks the boundary of the range from Verona to Trento. Further east, the Mocheni Valley forms the boundary, followed by the Sugana Valley (Brenta) to Bassano del Grappa and the North Italian Plain, from where Verona is reached.

Neighbouring ranges are: to the west, the Garda Mountains; to the north, the Fiemme Alps; and, to the east, the Dolomites.

== Notable peaks ==
- Cima Dodici (2,336 m)
- Cima Portule (2,310 m)
- Cima Carega (2,259 m)
- Cima Palon (2,232 m)
- Dente Italiano (2,220 m)
- Cima Posta (2,215 m)
- Cima del Cherlòng (2,210 m)
- Becco di Filadonna (2,150 m)
- Cima Mosca (2,141 m)
- Monte Ortigara (2,105 m)
- Monte Forni Alti (2,027 m)
- Monte Verena (2,015 m)
- Monte Plische, (Gruppo della Carega) (1,991 m)
- Monte Zevola, (Catena delle Tre Croci) (1,976 m)
- Monte Cornetto (1,899 m)
- Monte Priaforà (1,659 m)
- Monte Summano (1,296 m)
