= Morto =

Morto may refer to:

== Places ==
- Mar Morto (sea), Portuguese name for Dead Sea in the Middle East
- Boi Morto, a bairro in the District of Sede in the municipality of Santa Maria, in the Brazilian state of Rio Grande do Sul
- Lago Morto, a lake in the Province of Treviso, Veneto, Italy
- Morto Bay, or Bay of Morto, an inlet on the tip of Cape Helles on the Gallipoli Peninsula in Turkey
- Morto River, a river of Santa Catarina state in southeastern Brazil
- Pic Morto, a mountain of Catalonia, Spain

== People ==
- Mezzo Morto Hüseyin Pasha, or Hussein Mezzomorto (died 1701), an Ottoman privateer, bey (governor), and finally Grand Admiral (Kapudan Pasha) of the Ottoman Navy
- Morto da Feltre, Italian painter of the Venetian school who worked at the close of the 15th century and beginning of the 16th
- Mortó Dessai (1922-????), Indian medical analyst of Goan origin

== Others ==
- Juwana Morto, a former coastal artillery battery on the island of Aruba
- Mar Morto, the Portuguese name for Sea of Death, a Brazilian Modernist novel written by Jorge Amado
