= Lessinia Regional Park =

Nature reserve in Veneto, Italy

Parco naturale regionale della Lessinia
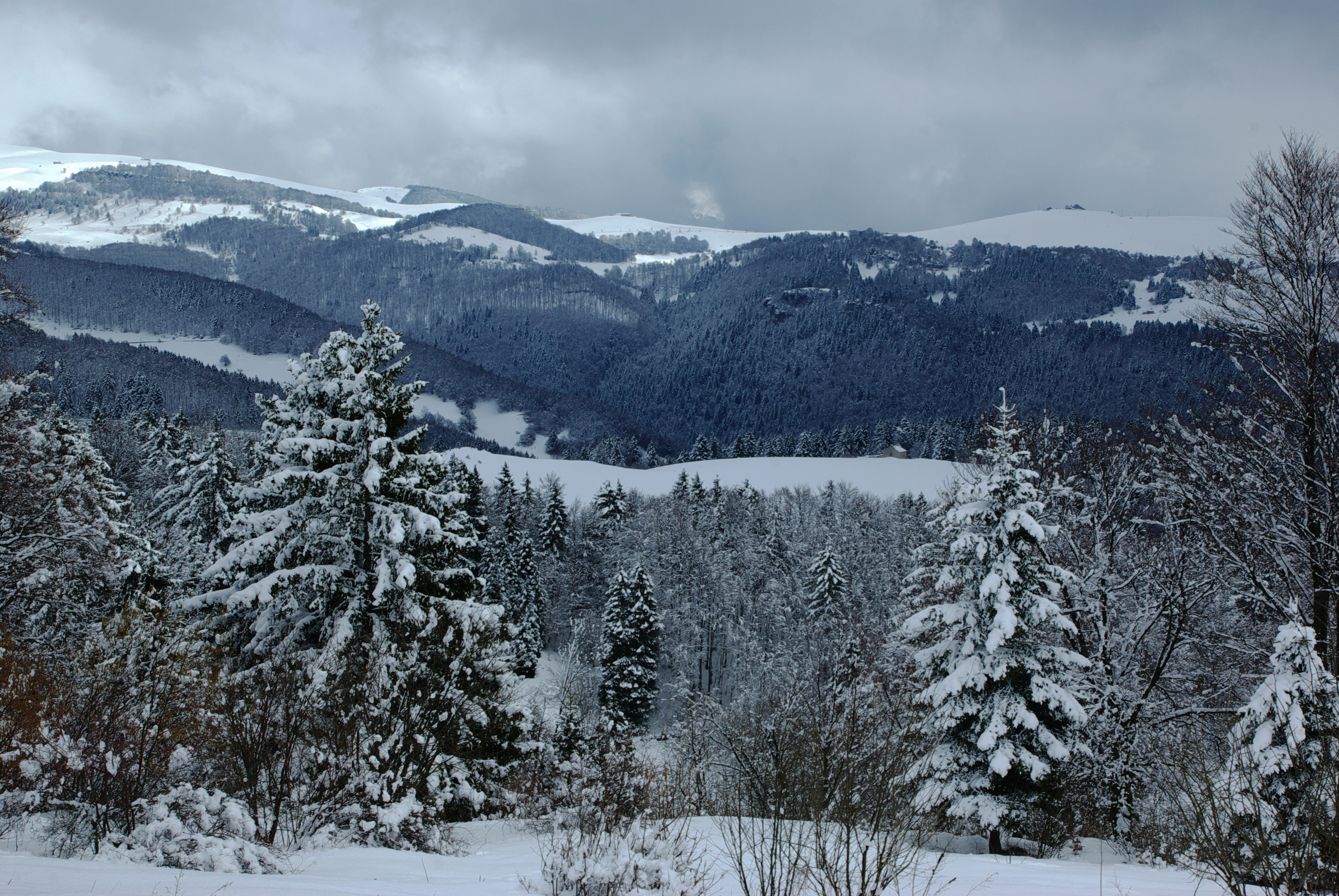
- Interactive map of Parco naturale regionale della Lessinia
- Location: Veneto, Italy
- Coordinates: 45°41′N 11°03′E
- Area: 10,201 ha (25,210 acres)
- Established: 1990
- Website: lessiniapark.it

The Lessinia Regional Park (Italian: Parco naturale regionale della Lessinia) is a nature reserve in Veneto, Italy. Established in 1990, it covers the northern part of the Lessinia region, in the Venetian Prealps, between the provinces of Verona and Vicenza. It is both a Special Protection Area and a Site of Community Importance.

The park stretches over 10,000 hectares in the territory of fifteen municipalities, thirteen of which belong to the province of Verona and the remaining two to the province of Vicenza; it encompasses all the mountains of the province of Verona, between 1,200 and 1,900 meters above sea level, except for Monte Baldo. The highest point of the park is the peak of Monte Zevola, 1,976 meters above sea level.

Agroforestry and silvopasture have played an important role in shaping Lessinia, with much of its territory consisting of pastures – among the most extensive pasturages in the Italian Alps. Cows, sheep (including the Brogna, a breed unique to Lessinia), goats and horses are bred in the region.

The park's flora consists of hornbeams, oaks and chestnuts in the valleys, beeches and pines at higher elevations, and alders, mountain pines and rhododendrons at the highest altitudes. The fauna includes red deer, roe deer, chamois, marmots, foxes, European hares, golden eagles, Eurasian eagle-owls, Western capercaillie, black grouse, hazel grouse, snowfinches, Alpine newts, and fire salamanders. Wolves, which had become extinct in the region in the first half of the 19th century, made their return in 2012, when Slavc, a male wolf coming from Slovenia, formed a breeding pair with Giulietta, a female coming from farther west in the Italian Alps; Giulietta gave birth to at least 42 wolves over the next decade, heavily contributing to the reintroduction of the species in the Eastern Alps.

The park was managed by the mountain community of Lessinia until 2019, when a body specifically tasked with its management was created, in compliance with a new regional law. In 2020, five municipalities proposed to cut the park's area by 2,000 hectares, claiming that the park imposed excessive restrictions and bureaucracy on agricultural activities; the proposal was approved by the regional council of Veneto, but dropped following massive protests by environmentalists, including a symbolic march by 10,000 people in the territory of Bosco Chiesanuova, where the seat of the park is located.
