= Col Visentin =

Mountain in Veneto, Italy

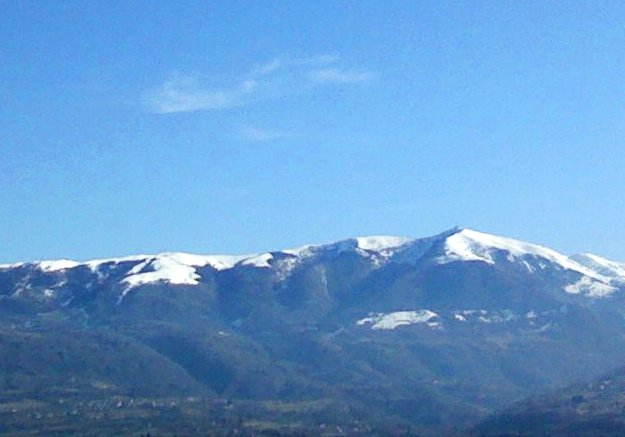
- Visentin as seen from Sois

Highest point
- Elevation: 1,763 m (5,784 ft)
- Prominence: 1,295 m (4,249 ft)
- Isolation: 1,545 km (960 mi)
- Coordinates: 46°11′37″N 12°23′10″E

Geography
- Location within Italy
- Location: Belluno/Vittorio Veneto, Italy
- Parent range: Bellunes Alps

Col Visentin (1,763 m a.s.l.) is a mountain in the Bellunes Alps, in the Veneto region of Italy, which marks a geographical border point between the province of Belluno and the province of Treviso.

== Description ==
Col Visentin is located at the steepest tip of the southern slope of Nevegal belonging territorially to the province of Treviso. (Note: The northern slope of Nevegal has gentle and scenic slopes, and belongs to the province of Belluno overhanging the Fadalto.)

The summit of Col Visentin at an elevation of 1,763 meters (3,763 feet) is in a dominant position over the Treviso plain and the Valbelluna, overlooking the Fadalto pass, Val Lapisina, Lago Morto and Lago di Santa Croce, as well as Montello.

From the summit, the horizon ranges from Mount Pizzoc to the Venetian Lagoon, from the Euganean Hills to the Cansiglio plateau. The view extends as well over much of the Dolomites, of which the highest peaks can be glimpsed.

=== Origin of the name ===
To avoid a war, the city of Vicenza in 1414 gave the keys to its gates to Venice, which was increasingly expanding inland, thus ineluctably becoming part of the Venetian Republic. The city was initially stripped of many goods and properties, and many city nobles and those from the surrounding countryside abandoned the city to avoid further requisitions. Vicenza then fell into a severe and deep period of economic crisis and thus became prey to every kind of delinquency and all kinds of thugs.

The Serenissima, realizing the serious economic distress in which the citizens of Vicenza were plunged, enacted serious legislative measures and concrete tax concessions to encourage the establishment of a new and stable nobility, which soon resumed strict and complete control of the city.

On June 12, 1486, the Jews were also expelled. These masses headed to neighboring cities, such as Verona, Padua, but were rejected. The Jews then decided to go to Treviso thinking that they would be welcomed because of historical rivalries, since the Trevisans had fought against Vicenza, and because they were defeated, they poisoned Cangrande I della Scala who died in excruciating pain on July 22, 1329, after his peaceful triumphal arrival in the city. (Note: On July 18, 1329, Cangrande I della Scala triumphantly entered Treviso without bloodshed and with peace intentions for a politically agreed annexation to crown his plan to reunite all of Veneto.) (Note: Legend has it that the assassination of Cangrande I della Scala was accomplished by means of dishes of poisoned Montello mushrooms given to him by a beautiful woman sent to him in his bed, and from the infamous area of Col Visentin. (Source: Legends of Treviso; Ancient Archives, Treviso)) (Note: In February 2004, Cangrande's tomb was opened to carry out the paleopathological study of his body in an excellent state of preservation, and investigate the cause of death. Digital X-rays, CT scan, autopsy examination, palynological and toxicological analysis, and a computed tomography (CT) scan performed at Verona Hospital showed that a thick compound was present in the esophageal lumen, referable to food material ingested immediately before death.) (Note: The paleopathology team of Professor Gino Fornaciari of the University of Pisa has solved this medieval mystery by conducting an autopsy on the mummified body of Cangrande I della Scala. It was shown that the Lord of Verona died of poisoning: "Analysis revealed that Cangrande was intoxicated by the oral administration of an infusion, or decoction, made from chamomile and mulberry in which digitalis was contained.") (Note: Digitalis purpurea is an herbaceous plant species known in the Middle Ages as a poisonous plant and still found in the upper Treviso area.)

These masses of exiles were rejected by the city, though they nevertheless obtained from the Trevisans (Note: In exchange for the appropriation, the Jews had to pay a certain annual tribute in goldsmithing artifacts.) the right to settle at the hill that would become precisely Col dei Vicentini, hence dialectally later called Col Visentin. (Note: The specific name was thus given precisely to indicate to everyone where Jewish communities were settled.) (Note: The policy and justice of the people of Treviso was in accordance with that of the time, which provided for the forced removal of all those people who had been guilty, with recidivism, of many crimes. Such removals were promoted all in the Col Visentin area, in order to better indicate to all citizens, even from afar, the place at which it was advisable not to go to avoid trouble, robbery, swindling, as well as the historic prostitutes who engaged in meretricious practices with anyone.)

=== Geomorphology ===
The Visentin Group is the result of the erosion of the Piave Glacier and its lapesine branch. The lithological formations of the Visentin Group area are marine sedimentary and calcareous in origin, dating from the Jurassic to Middle Miocene period.

In the western part, the anticlinal fold of Col Visentin extends to the Lapisina Valley and is characterized by the presence of Jurassic basinal deposits that have been displaced by the presence of reverse faults parallel to the valley axis, and belonging to the Longhere-Fadalto-Cadola Line, terminating in the Colesei flower structure. (Note: The geomorphological shaping of the mountain range and afferent valleys are due to the last two glaciations, namely the Rissian and especially the Wurmian glaciations. Of the Rissi glaciation there are no moraine deposits in the valley, but of importance is the interglacial period where precipitation waters combined with melt waters carried a large amount of debris (See: Della Libera, 2004). The last glaciation, on the other hand, is the most important for the shaping of the valley which is estimated to have started around 75 thousand years ago due to a reduction in air temperature by a few degrees and an increase in winter precipitation. (See: Dall'Arche et alii, 1979))

Mesozoic sequences outcrop in the central-southern part of the Lapisina Valley and represent transitional terms between pelagic and scarp facies, in which the area is located at the margin between the Bellunese Basin and the Friulian Platform. (Note: Due to its calcareous nature, Col Visentin is affected by small caves with variable sizes, limited in the localities of Col Toronto, Maren, Col Formigher, and Borgo Olivi. Many morphological studies have been used with the information collected in the Catasto delle Cavità del Veneto managed by the Italian Speleological Federation.)

Further south are the molasse terrigenous deposits that make up the Tertiary formations. The Quaternary deposits consist of Holocene and late Pleistocene materials that form the superficial deposits concentrated in the valley floor that have considerable extensions with thicknesses of up to two hundred meters north of Lago Morto. These deposits represent the product of the action of various agents that have operated and still operate in the area.

=== Ascent to the summit ===
Col Visentin is a well-known destination for easy hikes on the Nevegal mountain range, and is home to important meteorological facilities, radio communication, broadcasting and repeater facilities for television channels.

It is possible to ascend to the peak starting from the north by reaching the Nevegal tourist resort from which one ascends by an easy road to the Rifugio Casera at (1,400 m); from there begins the Sentiero delle creste that leads to Col Faverghera (1,030 m), which reaches a Botanical Garden and the Rifugio Brigata (1,617 m); (Note: Alpine hut and barracks of the former Cadore Brigade.) continuing on to Col Toront (1,675 m) and finally to the Rifugio Col Visentin at (1,673 m).

Rifugio Col Visentin can also be easily reached from the south by the small road from Serravalle to the Col Occett parking lot, from where a beautiful hiking trail through the Occett Woods begins. (Note: In summer, Col Visentin and Nevegal, with their many hiking trails, are an important tourist destination, with visitors flocking to all three refuges run by the Italian Alpine Club: Rifugio Col Visentin, Rifugio Angelo Bristot, and Rifugio Brigata Alpina Cadore. There are many mountain bike-downhill itineraries. Free climbing is also possible in some locations. There are also many ski slopes, served by a chairlift that is not currently operational.)

== Image gallery ==
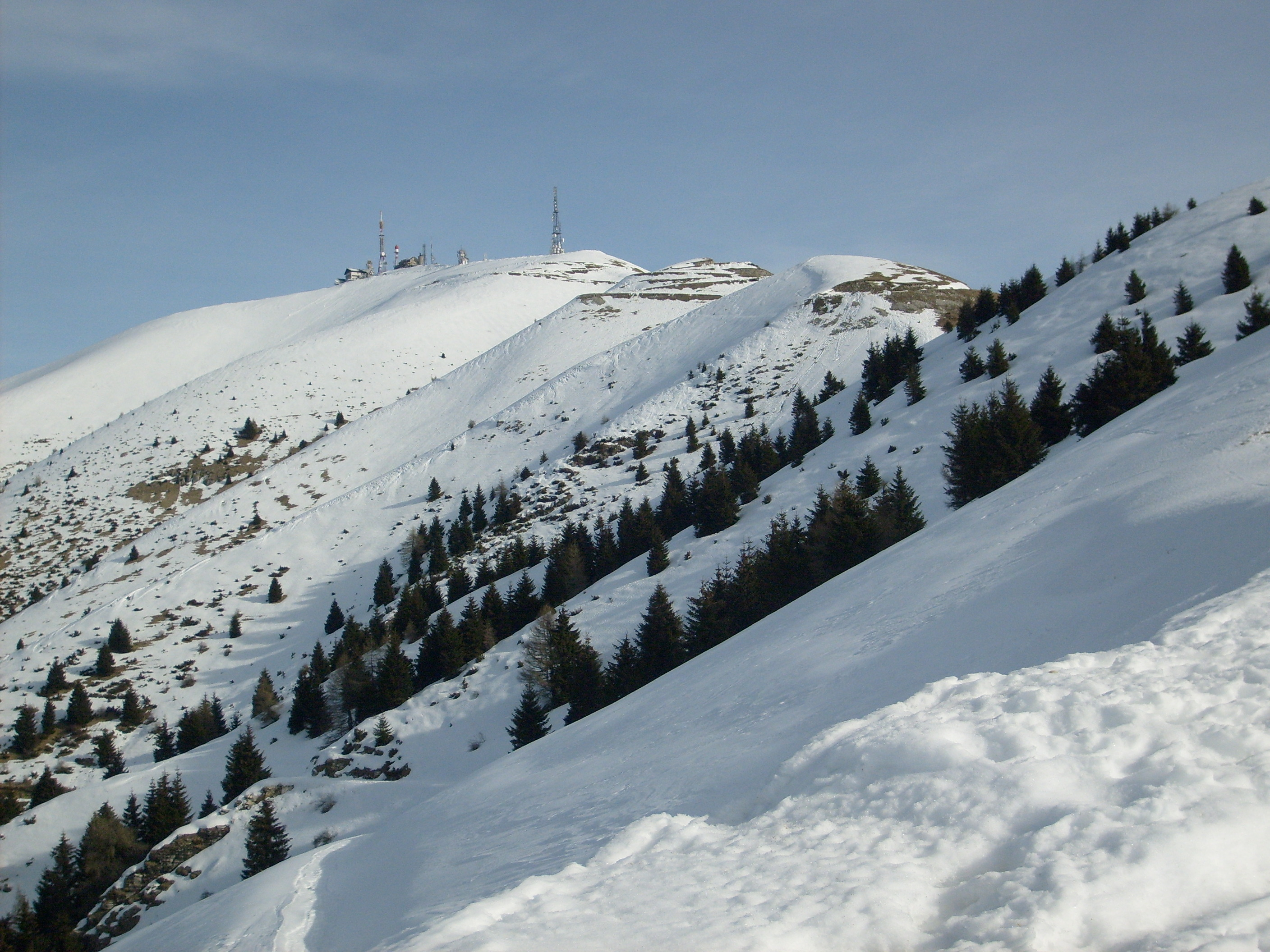
Col Visentin as seen from the military road

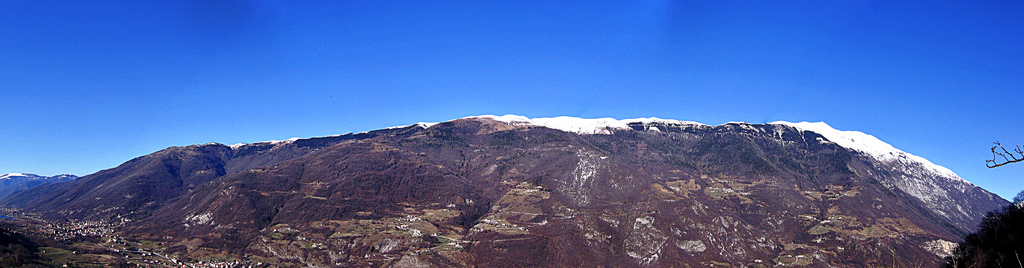
Overview of Col Visentin from Vittorio Veneto

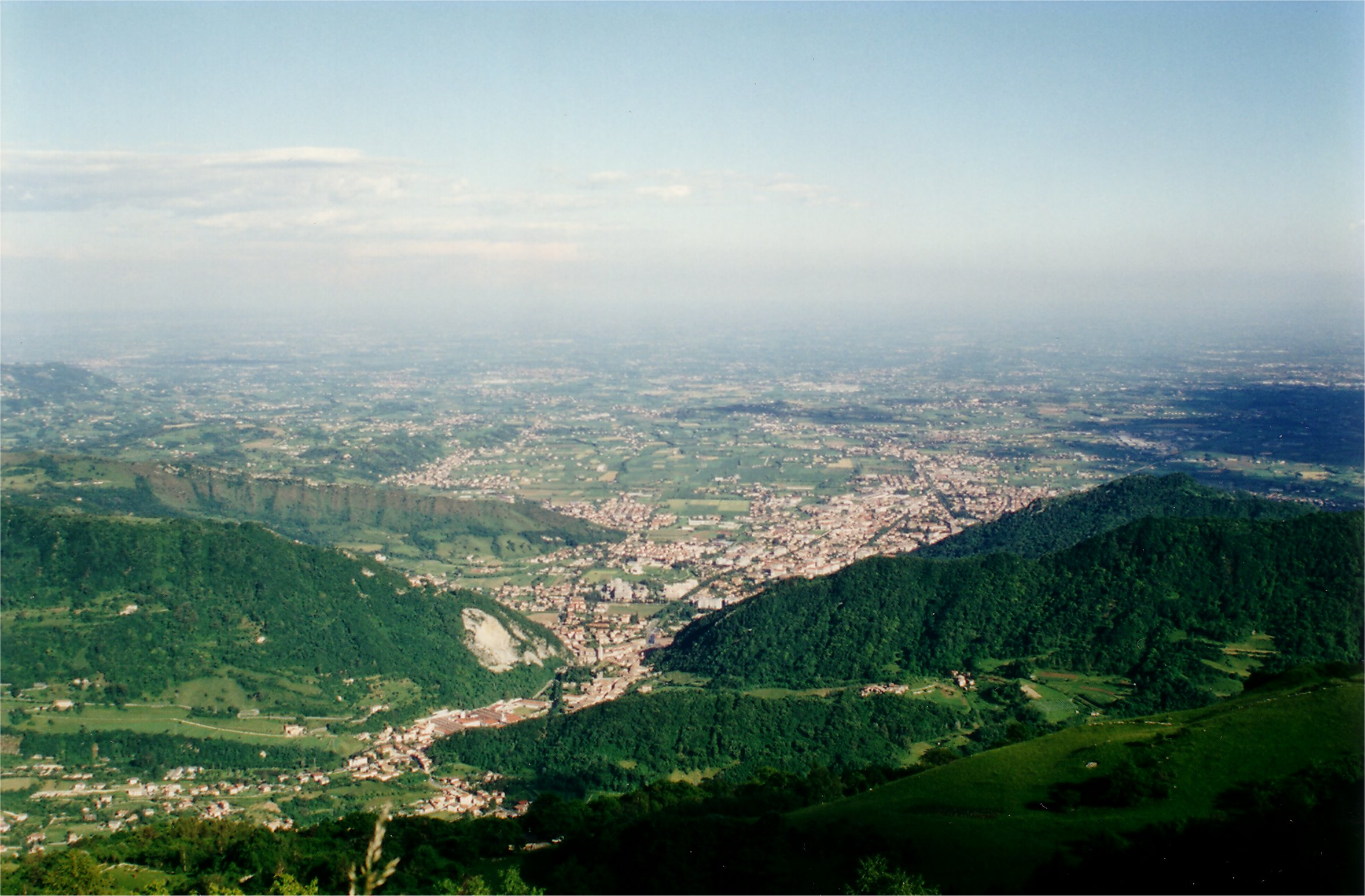
View from Col Visentin toward Vittorio Veneto and the plains

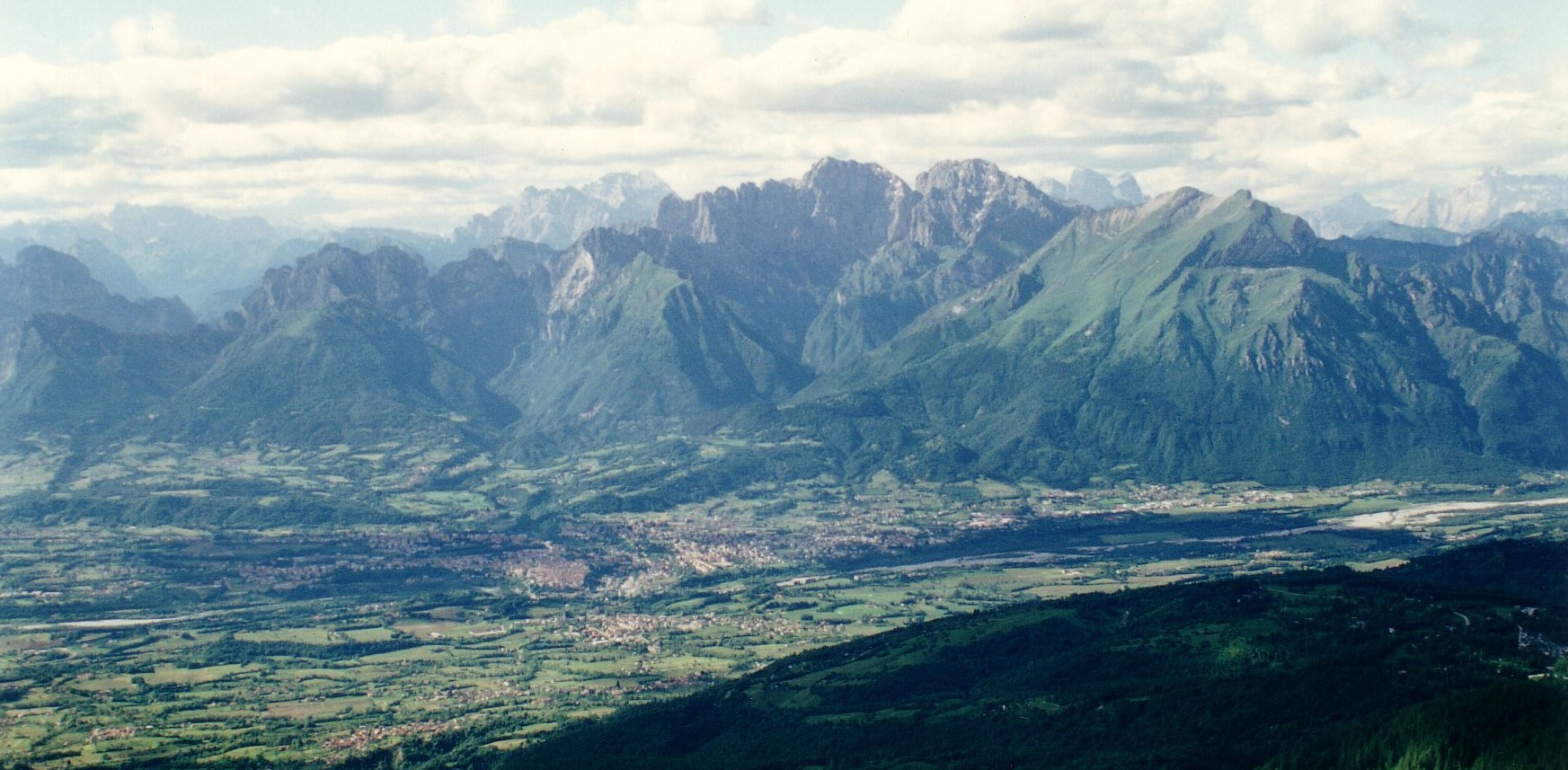
View from Col Visentin towards Belluno and the Dolomiti Bellunesi National Park

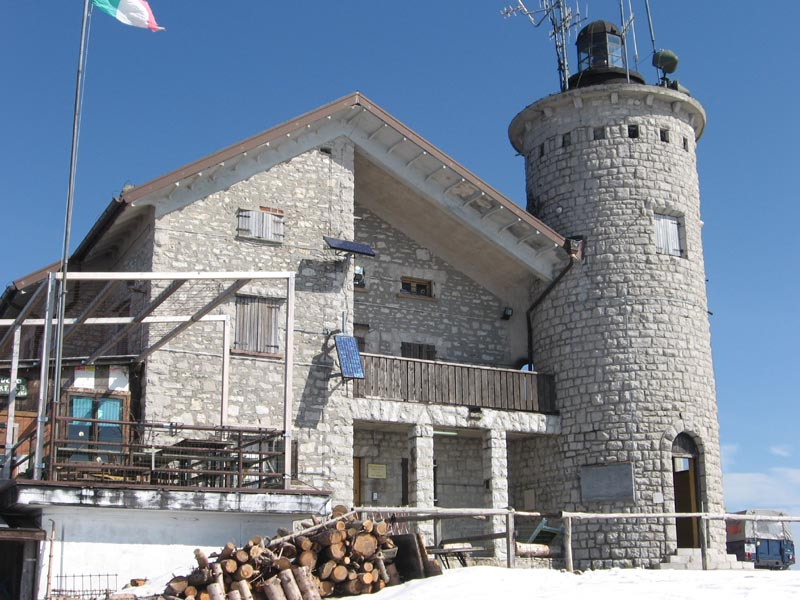
Rifugio V Artiglieria Alpina on Col Visentin

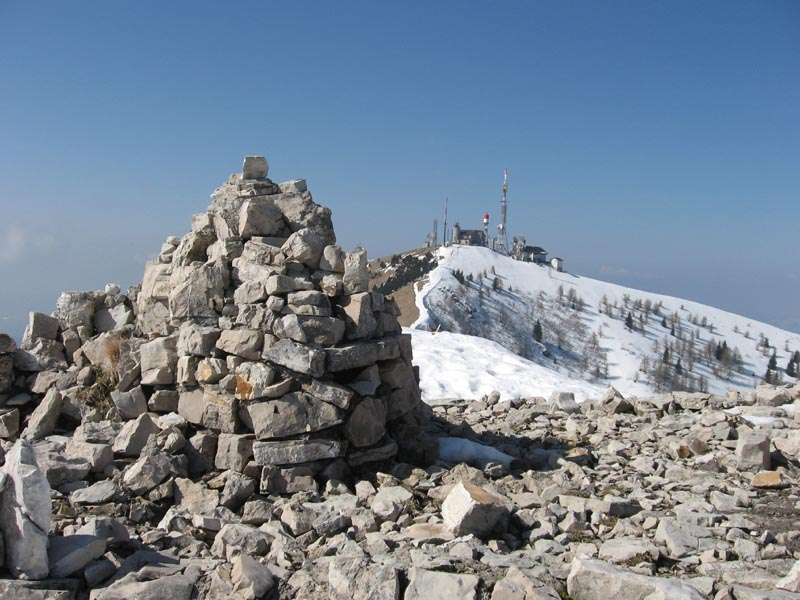
The arrival at Rifugio Visentin from the Creste trail.

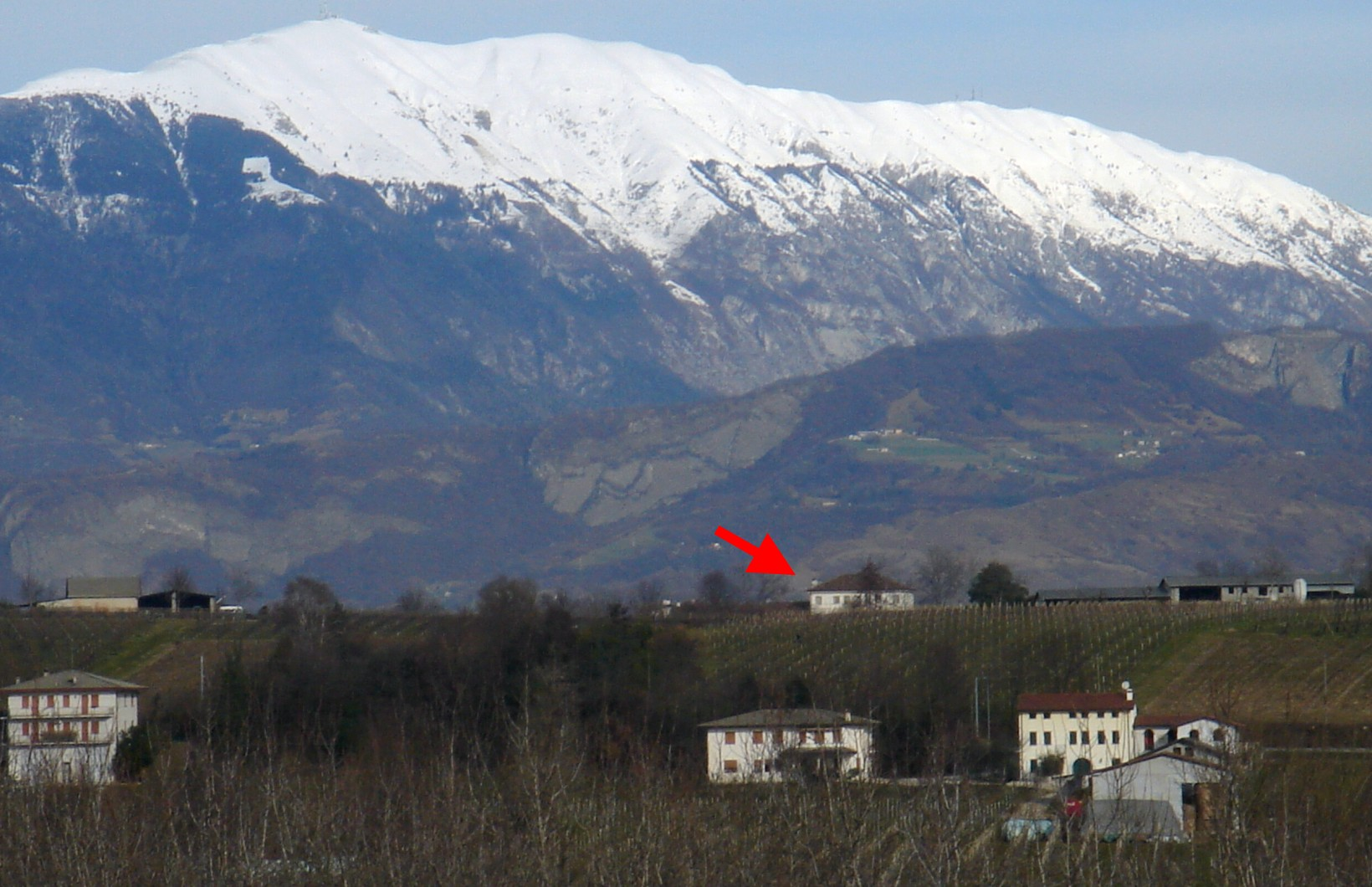
Col Visentin from Castello Roganzuolo (the arrow points to Titian's 'hut')

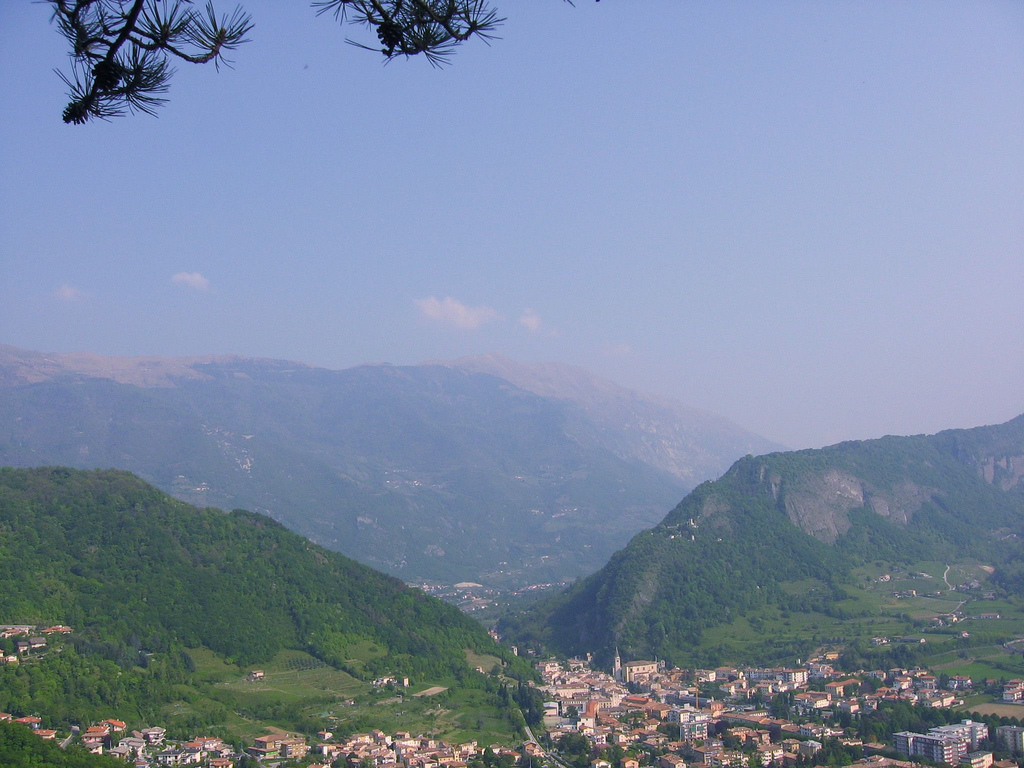
The Visentin group; below, Serravalle

== See also ==
- Bellunes Alps
- Lago Morto
- Province of Treviso
- Province of Belluno

== Bibliography ==
- Jori, Francesco (2015). Storia di Vicenza. Dalle origini ai giorni nostri. Biblioteca dell'Immagine.
- Rapelli, Giovanni (2007). I cognomi del territorio veronese. Cierre edizioni. p. 729.
- Carraro, Giovanni (2015). Visentin selvaggio. Edicicloeditore.
- Möschter, Angela (2005). Gli ebrei a Treviso durante la dominazione veneziana (1388-1509). Firenze University Press.
- Dall'Arche, L.; Mattana, U.; Toniello, V. I limiti raggiunti dall'antico ghiacciaio del Piave nella valle Lapisina e in Valmareno (Treviso); Studi trentini di Scienze Naturali. Vol. 56. Trento. pp. 39–52.
