= Monte Cavallo (Bellunes Alps) =

Mountain in Friuli-Venezia Giulia and Veneto, Italy

- Cimon del Cavallo
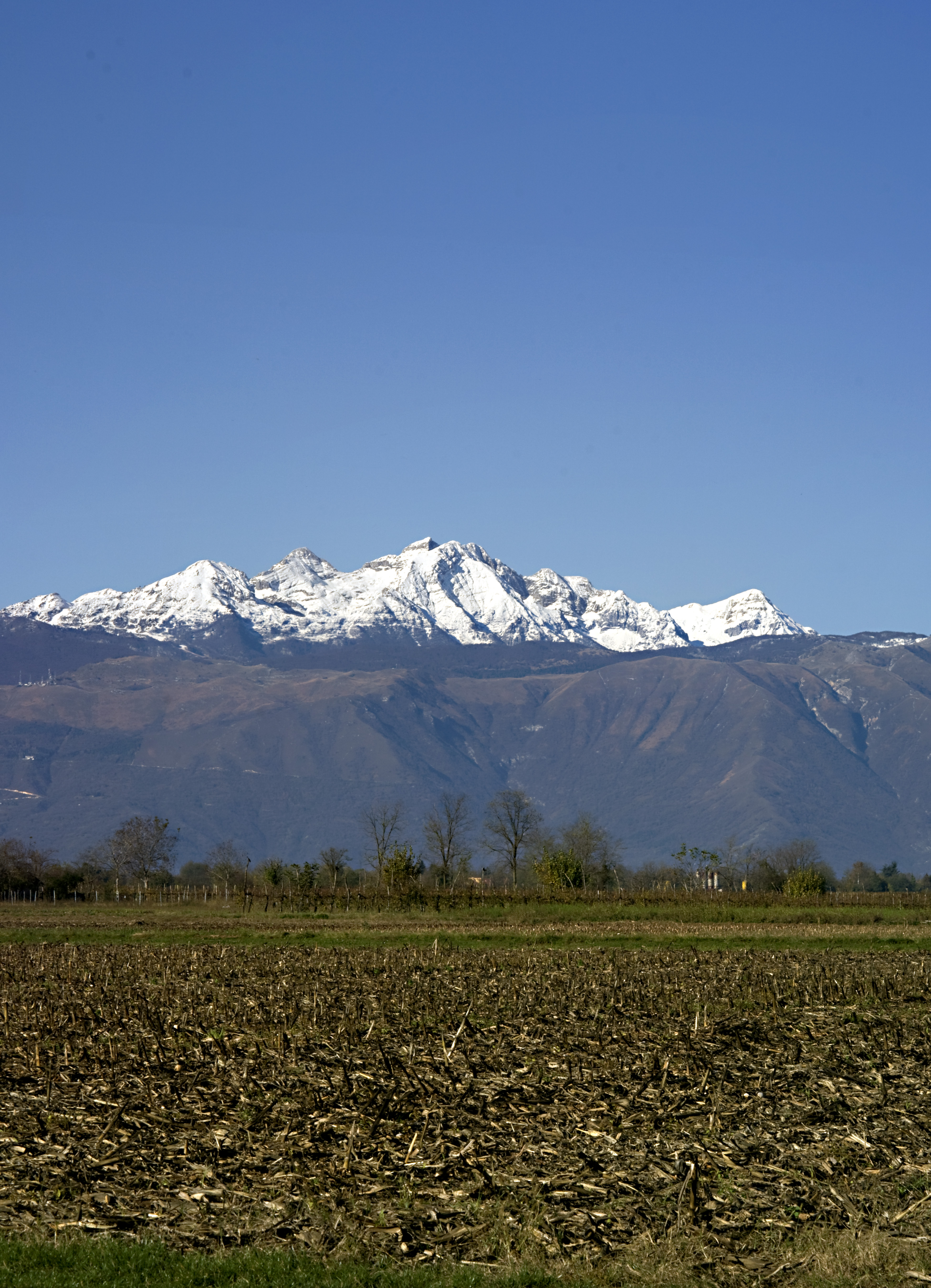
- The Monte Cavallo group overlooking the foothills, seen from the countryside of Cordenons (Friulian plain)

Highest point
- Elevation: 2,251 m (7,385 ft)
- Prominence: 350 m (1,150 ft)
- Coordinates: 46°7′47″N 12°29′48″E

Geography
- Country: Italy
- Region(s): Friuli-Venezia Giulia; Veneto
- Parent range: Alps

Climbing
- First ascent: July 1726

The Monte Cavallo (or Cimon del Cavallo) is a mountain in the Bellunes Alps that reaches 2,251 m, belonging to the Monte Cavallo-Col Nudo group (located slightly further north), which in turn is part of the Cavallo-Visentin range: situated behind Western Friuli, it rises over the Venetian plain, with a prominence exceeding 350 meters, making it visible from both Venice and the Adriatic coast on clear days.

== Description ==
=== Geography ===
It is a vast and articulated massif, composed of various peaks, among which ridges and saddles are interspersed: starting from the northeast and describing a counterclockwise arc, one can identify the Cimon dei Furlani (2,183 m a.s.l.), which through Forcella dei Furlani leads to Cima Manera (the highest peak of the group, 2,251 m a.s.l.), from which the Semenza refuge in Val di Piera is clearly visible, on the Tambre side of the mountain; then to the south, the ridge describes the Forcella del Cavallo, located between Manera and the Cimon di Palantina (2,162 m a.s.l.), from which a shoulder branches off toward the Alpago and Casera Palantina (southeast) and a ridge that, marked by the Forcella Colombera, leads to Monte Colombera (2,066 m a.s.l.).

From Colombera, one can either follow the Alta Via dei Rondoi to the last peak, Monte Tremol (2,007 m a.s.l.), or descend to the Forcella di Palantina Alta and, lower down, to Forcella "La Palantina". Between Monte Tremol and Forcella "La Palantina", in Val di Sass, lies the highest facility of the Piancavallo ski resort, managed by the pararegional company Promotour, and the ultra-modern Val di Sass refuge, which is also the arrival station of the "Tremol 2" chairlift. To the west, in eastern Veneto territory, lies the Cansiglio Plateau.

=== Geology and paleontology ===
The earliest recognized settlement in the area dates back to the end of the last Ice Age, when the entire massif was covered by 100–200 m of ice, except for Col delle Laste: with the melting of the glaciers, sediments like loess spread, corresponding to the prehistoric Piancavallo deposit, one of the oldest settlements in Western Friuli. This is based on artifacts uncovered during the construction of the ski resort in the 1970s.

These discoveries were followed by an expedition from the Institute of Geology and Paleontology of the University of Ferrara, which between 1972 and 1973 conducted systematic research to find potential human settlements, focusing on flat areas (considered favorable for human habitation): these investigations unearthed prehistoric lithic artifacts, charcoal, ochre fragments, tools, and ceramics. These suggest an Upper Paleolithic settlement (40,000-10,000 years ago), likely seasonal, repeatedly used for hunting. Other artifacts, believed to be from the Bronze Age, were found along the southeastern slopes of Monte Saùc, about 1 km from Casera Saùc, at an elevation of 900 meters a.s.l.

== History ==
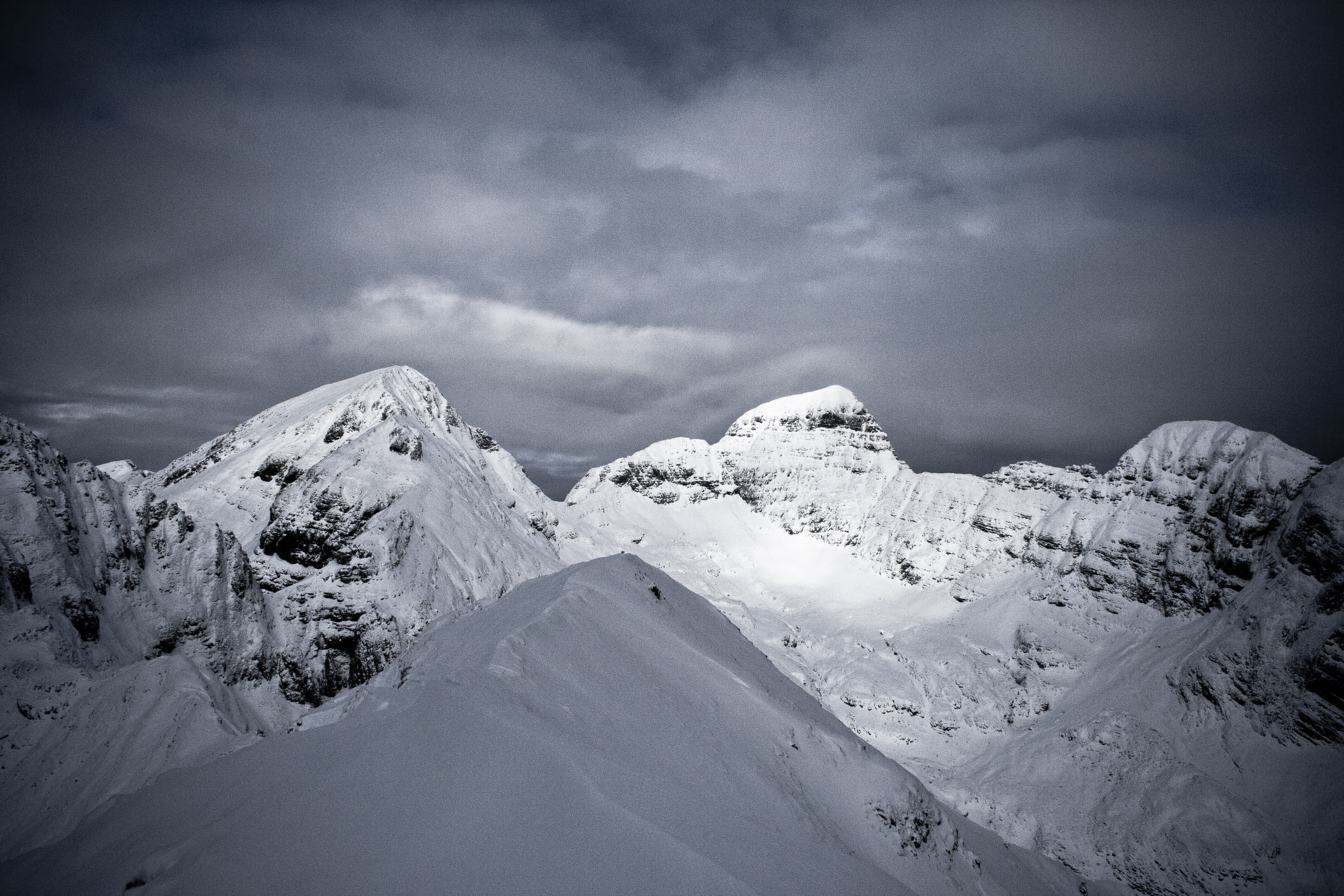
View from Cima del Tremol: from right, Cimon dei Furlani, Cima Manera, Cimon di Palantina

Before attracting the attention of local mountaineers, Piancavallo was inhabited by loggers, herdsmen, and hunters. The first refuge was the Policreti, inaugurated on August 2, 1925, originally a casera of the Policreti family from Aviano, made available to the CAI of Pordenone in November 1924. The structure, converted into an alpine refuge, was located at Col delle Lastre, in the Collalto area. During World War II, the shelter was burned by the Germans on September 9, 1944. The reference point for hikers in the post-war period was the Piancavallo refuge, built on the plateau starting in 1948 by the CAI (with the support of various sponsors); the construction was completed in 1956, also thanks to the creation of a drivable road to the castaldia, which greatly facilitated the work. The refuge was handed over to Promotour after the development of the tourism hub in the 1980s and is now the "Sport Hotel".

=== Toponym and legends ===
The name does not, as it might seem, refer to the homonymous animal; rather, it derives from the Celtic Keap-al ("high peak"), since it is a mountain clearly observable from most of the Venetian plain, which has evidently inspired the populations living in the plain since ancient times.

== Mountaineering and sports ==
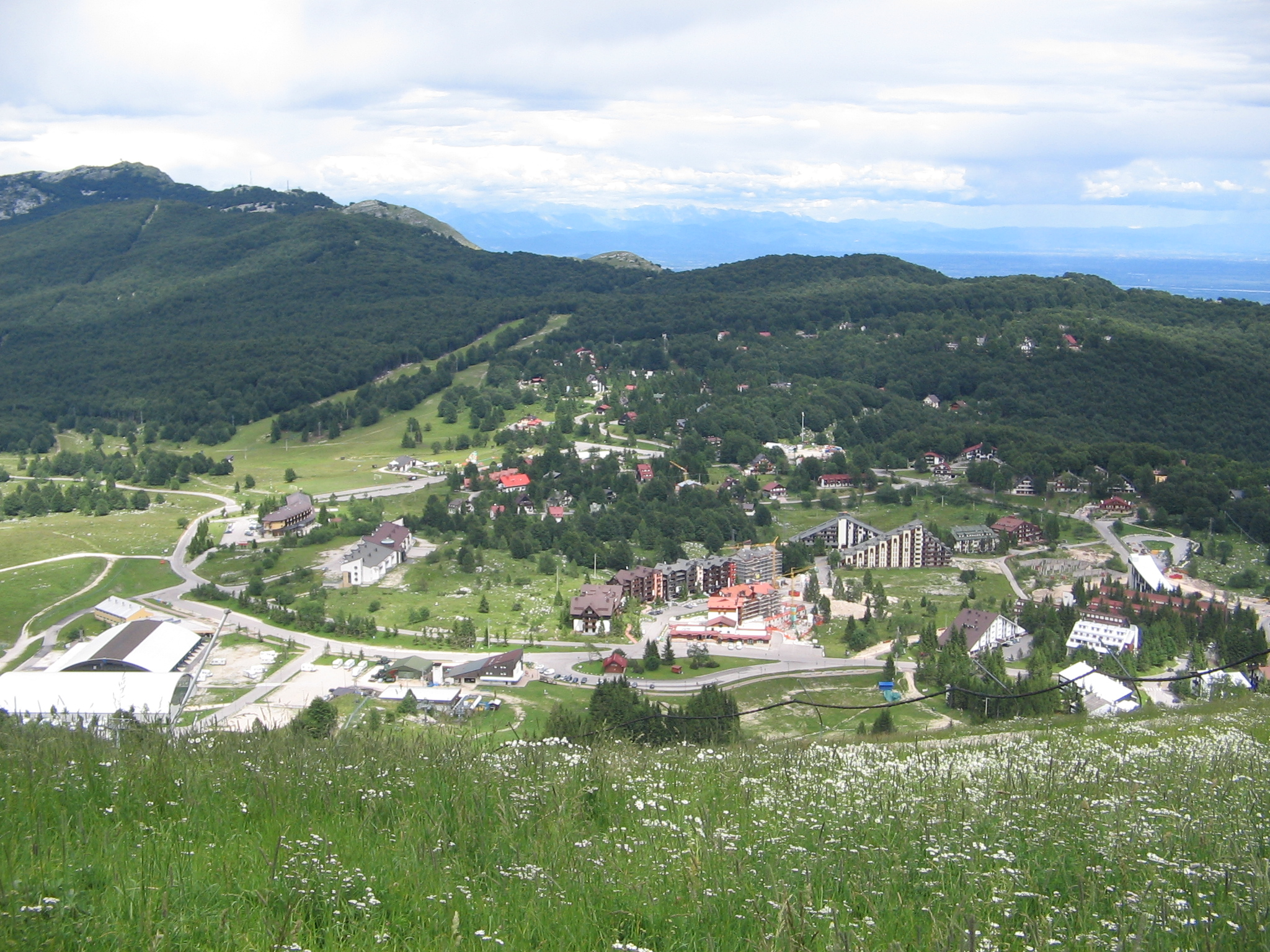
Piancavallo

Monte Cavallo was first conquered in 1726 by two botanists: Giovanni Girolamo Zannichelli and Domenico Pietro Stefanelli. Chronicles describe how they first headed to Aviano; then, riding mules, they reached a casera at the foot of the mountain, where they spent time searching for plant species and exploring the area. The ascent is described as taking place through rugged terrain, often crawling, passing "on the outer side of the mountain," to reach the summit after - they write - 7 miles. In any case, the account of the ascent focuses on the botanical aspect, without considering the mountaineering aspect, which was not yet recognized at the time.

=== Alta Via dei Rondoi ===
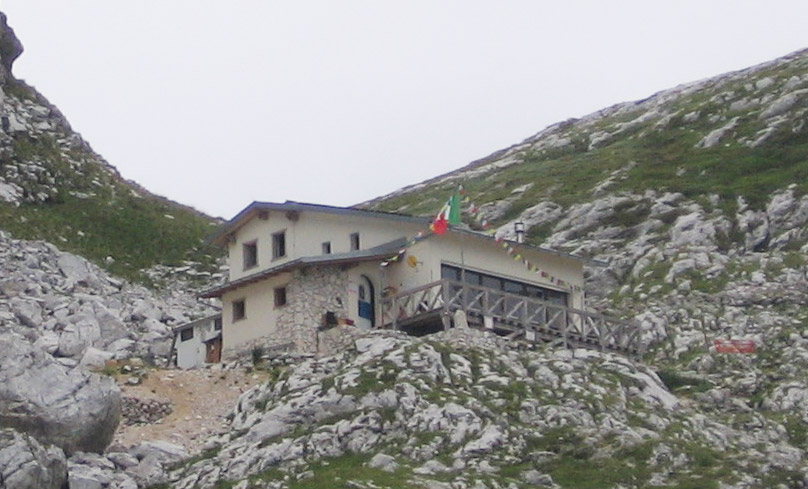
Rifugio Carlo e Massimo Semenza

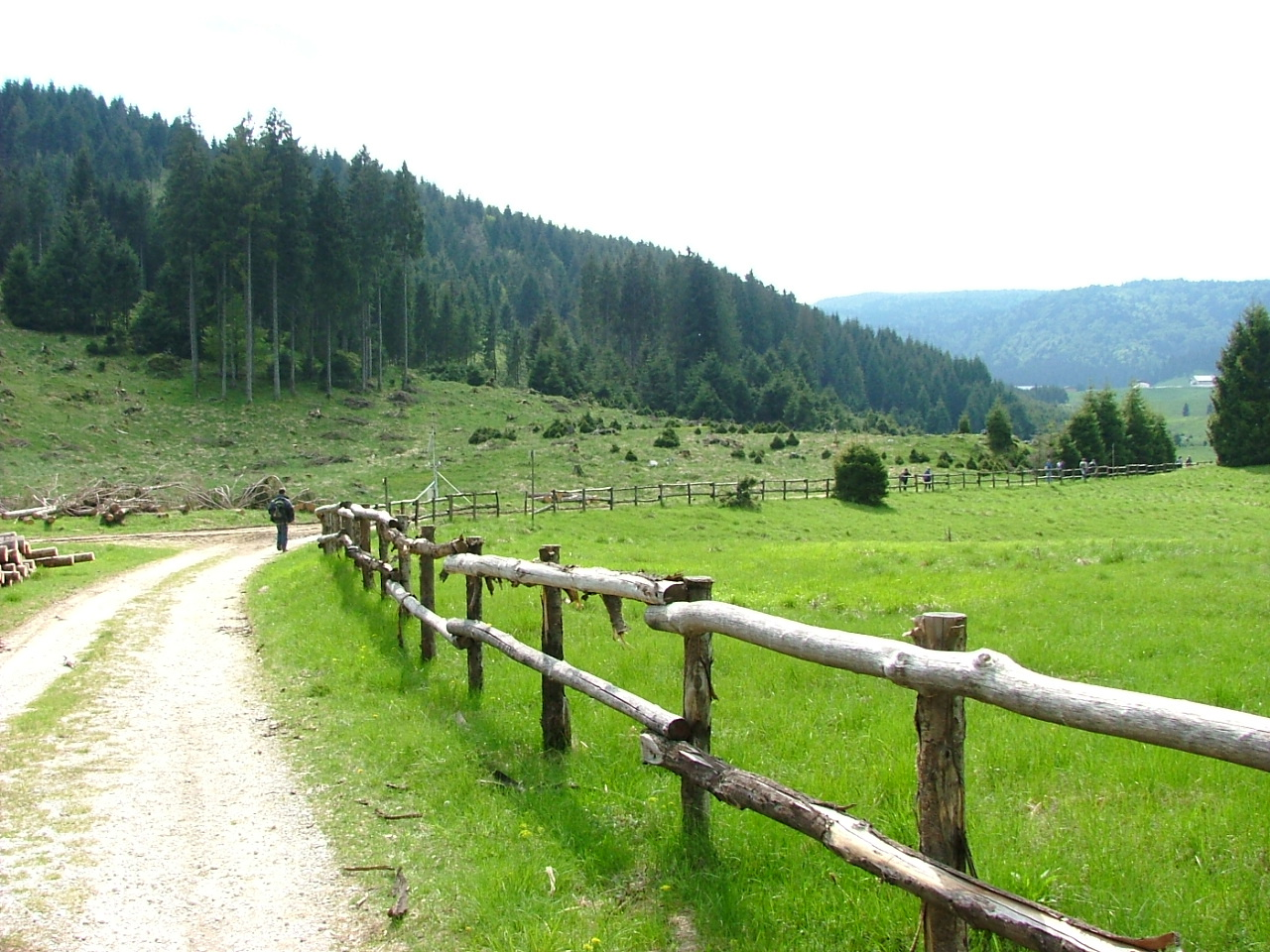
The Cansiglio, located west of the mountain group, in Veneto territory

In 1969, the Aviano subsection of the CAI of Pordenone decided to equip its mountains with a route that, following the ridge line, connects all five main peaks of the Cavallo group. This is a highly scenic route but requires caution due to several exposed passages and grassy slopes that can be very dangerous and slippery. The counterclockwise direction of the route is recommended to avoid descending the more delicate sections. The name refers to the swifts, a species very common in these areas. The route is completely devoid of water points and is not recommended in the presence of snow (June–October is the best period).

=== Ski mountaineering ===
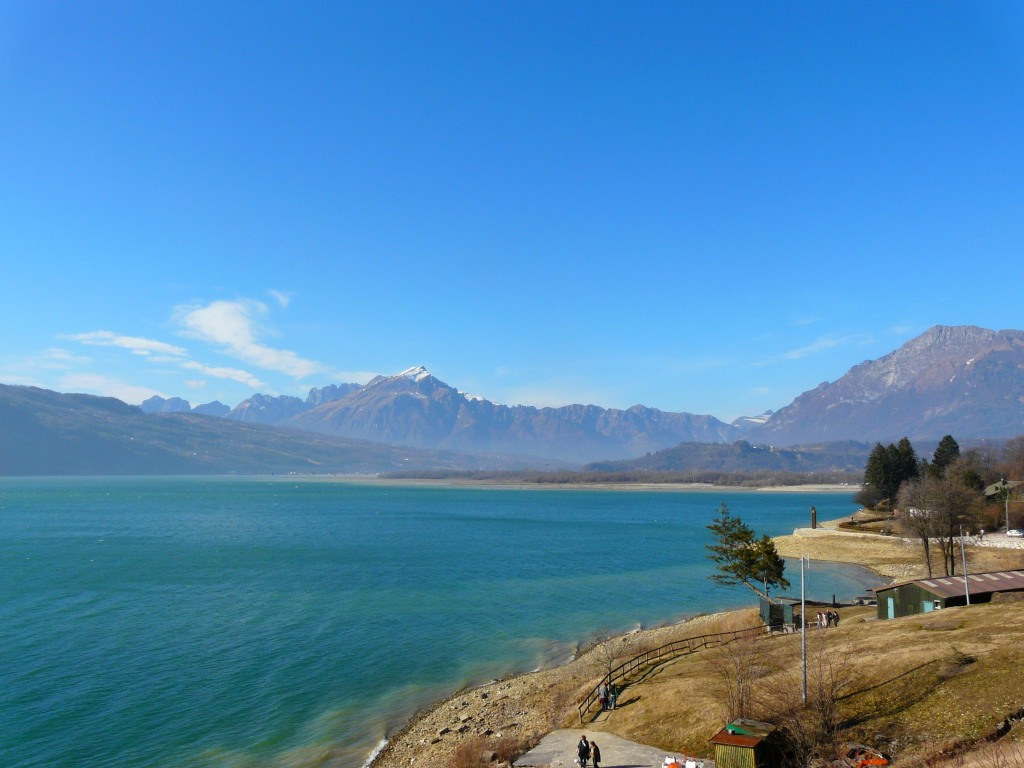
The Alpago region, west of the mountain group, in Veneto territory

The entire mountain group is highly suitable for ski mountaineering, but the first records are recent, as this is a decidedly modern way of tackling winter mountains, quite different from the adventures of the few who, with rudimentary equipment, managed to frequent this snow-covered environment in the past. The first evidence of this activity comes from an article published in the Triveneto magazine "Le Alpi Venete" in 1969 by Sergio Fradeloni and Silviano Zucchiatti, describing some routes.

The first systematic treatment consists of 33 routes published by Sergio Fradeloni in the guide "Dolomiti Orientali - Vol.II" by A. and C. Berti (1982) among the volumes of the CAI-TCI "Guida dei Monti d’Italia" series. The most comprehensive collection was published in 1986 by S. Fradeloni, U. Baccini, and M. de Benedet, covering 50 different routes.

The widespread popularity of competitive ski mountaineering has led to the development (thanks to the availability of the Promotour agency) of dedicated routes for ski mountaineers, ensuring a safe ascent path for those needing to train or simply for those who prefer to experience the winter environment in a more ecological and natural way, while still staying close to artificial facilities.

=== Skyrunning ===
Since 2007, the Montanaia Racing sports group has been organizing and promoting a skyrunning competition called Skyrace del Monte Cavallo that brings about 250 athletes each year to circumnavigate the mountain group, starting and finishing at Piancavallo: the route descends toward the Tornidor spring, then ascends the entire Val Grande to the homonymous saddle; skirting the upper part of Val Sperlonga, it reaches below Cima Lasté, up to the Semenza refuge; from there, a long descent leads to Alpago at Pian delle Laste; the route continues with an ascent to the lower Palantina saddle, then through Monte Tremol to Val Sughet on the Gerometta trail, which leads back to Piancavallo with a technical descent.

The competition has seen progressive growth over the years, eventually being included in prestigious circuits such as the Italian Sky Series or La Sportiva Gore-Tex Mountain Running Cup

== See also ==
- CAI
- Ski mountaineering

== Bibliography ==
- Mario Tomadini (2011). I Pascoli del Silenzio - Casere e Caseranti nel Piano del Cavallo (1850-1950) [The Pastures of Silence - Casere and Herdsmen in the Cavallo Plain (1850-1950)] (in Italian). Pordenone: Editrice La Voce.
- Francesca Orlando (2004). Fiabe e Leggende del Monte Cavallo [Fairy Tales and Legends of Monte Cavallo] (in Italian). Treviso: Editrice Santi Quaranta. ISBN 9788886496568.
- Ugo Baccini (1986). Sci Alpinismo in Col Nudo - Cavallo: Dolomiti orientali [Ski Mountaineering in Col Nudo - Cavallo: Eastern Dolomites] (in Italian). Maserà di Padova: Tamari montagna edizioni.
