= Venetian Prealps =

Mountain range in Italy

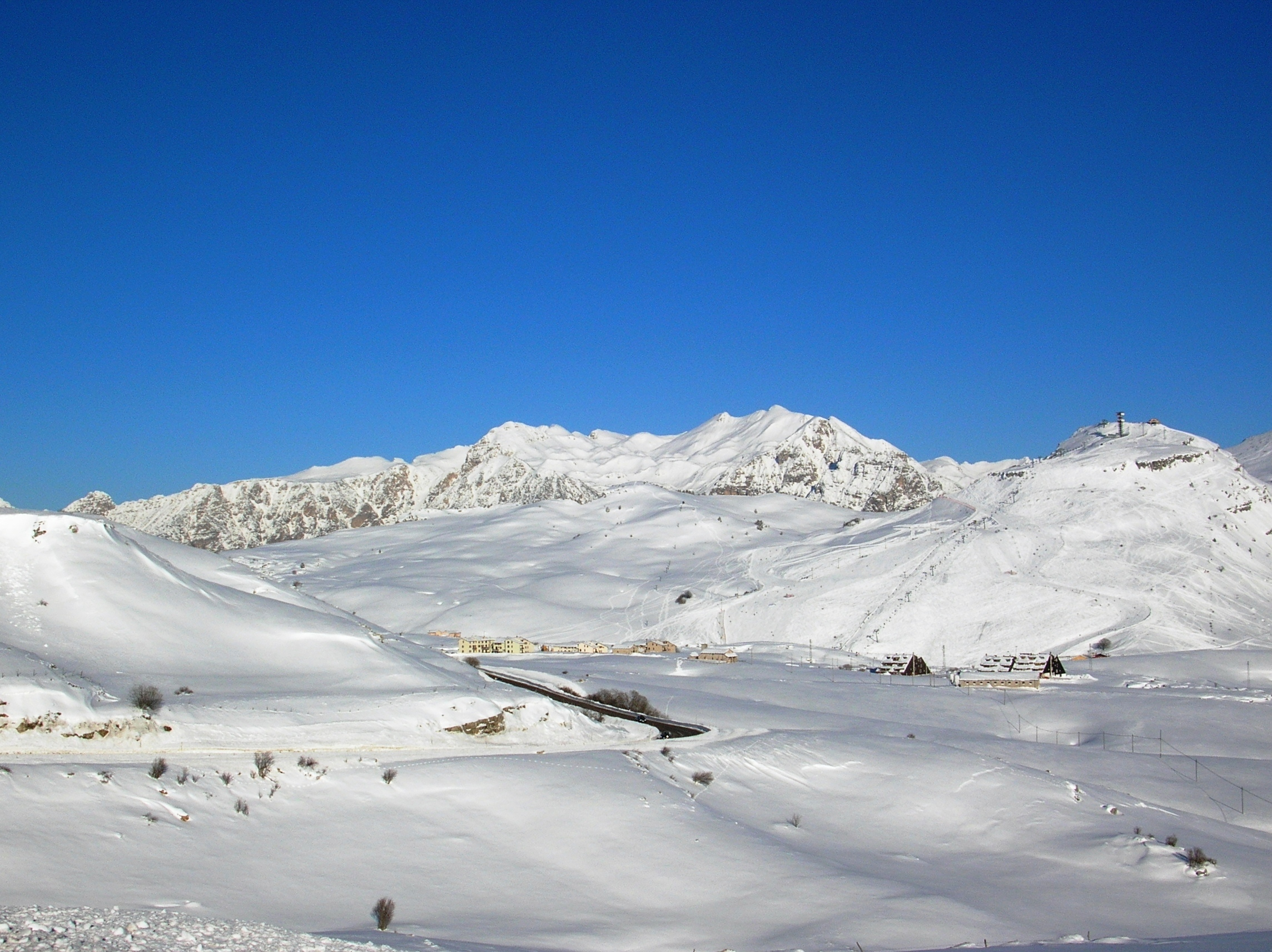
- Monti Lessini in winter

Highest point
- Peak: Col Nudo
- Elevation: 2,471 m (8,107 ft)
- Coordinates: 46°13′39″N 12°24′12″E

Naming
- Native name: Prealpi Venete (Italian)

Geography
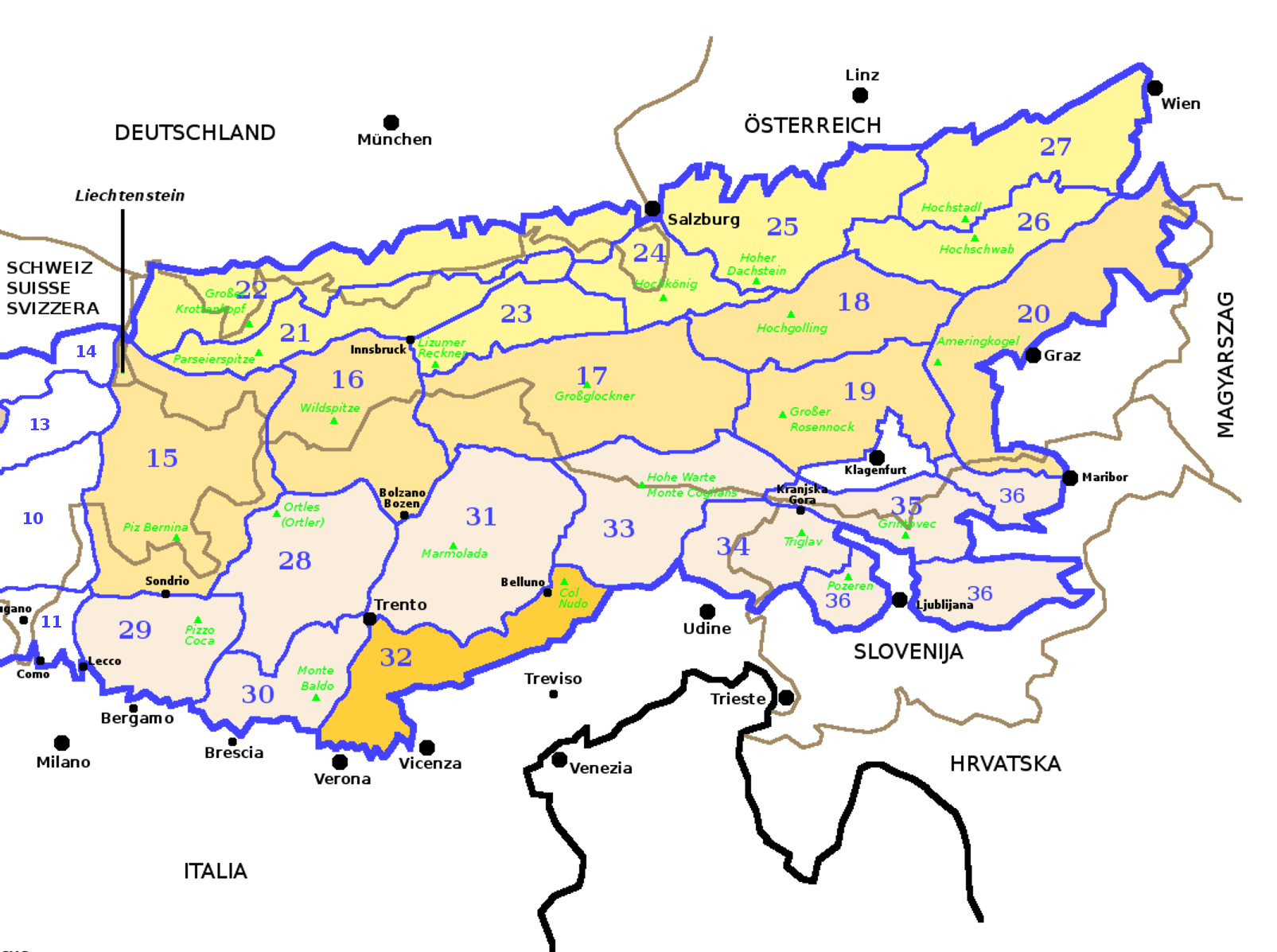
- Venetian prealps (section nr.32) within Eastern Alps
- Country: Italy
- Regions: Veneto, Friuli-Venezia Giulia and Trentino-Alto Adige/Südtirol
- Provinces: Trento, Verona, Vicenza, Treviso, Belluno and Pordenone
- Parent range: Alps
- Borders on: Brescia and Garda Prealps, Dolomites, Carnic and Gailtal Alps and Venetian Plain

Geology
- Orogeny: Alpine orogeny

The Venetian Prealps (Prealpi Venete in Italian) are a mountain range in the south-eastern part of the Alps. They are located in Triveneto, in the north-eastern part of Italy.

== Geography ==
Administratively the range is divided between the Italian provinces of Trento (in the region of Trentino Alto Adige), Verona, Vicenza, Treviso, Belluno (in the Region of Veneto) and Pordenone (in the region of Friuli-Venezia Giulia).

The Venetian Prealps are drained by the rivers Adige, Brenta, Piave and other minor rivers and streams, all of them tributaries of the Adriatic Sea.

== Summits ==
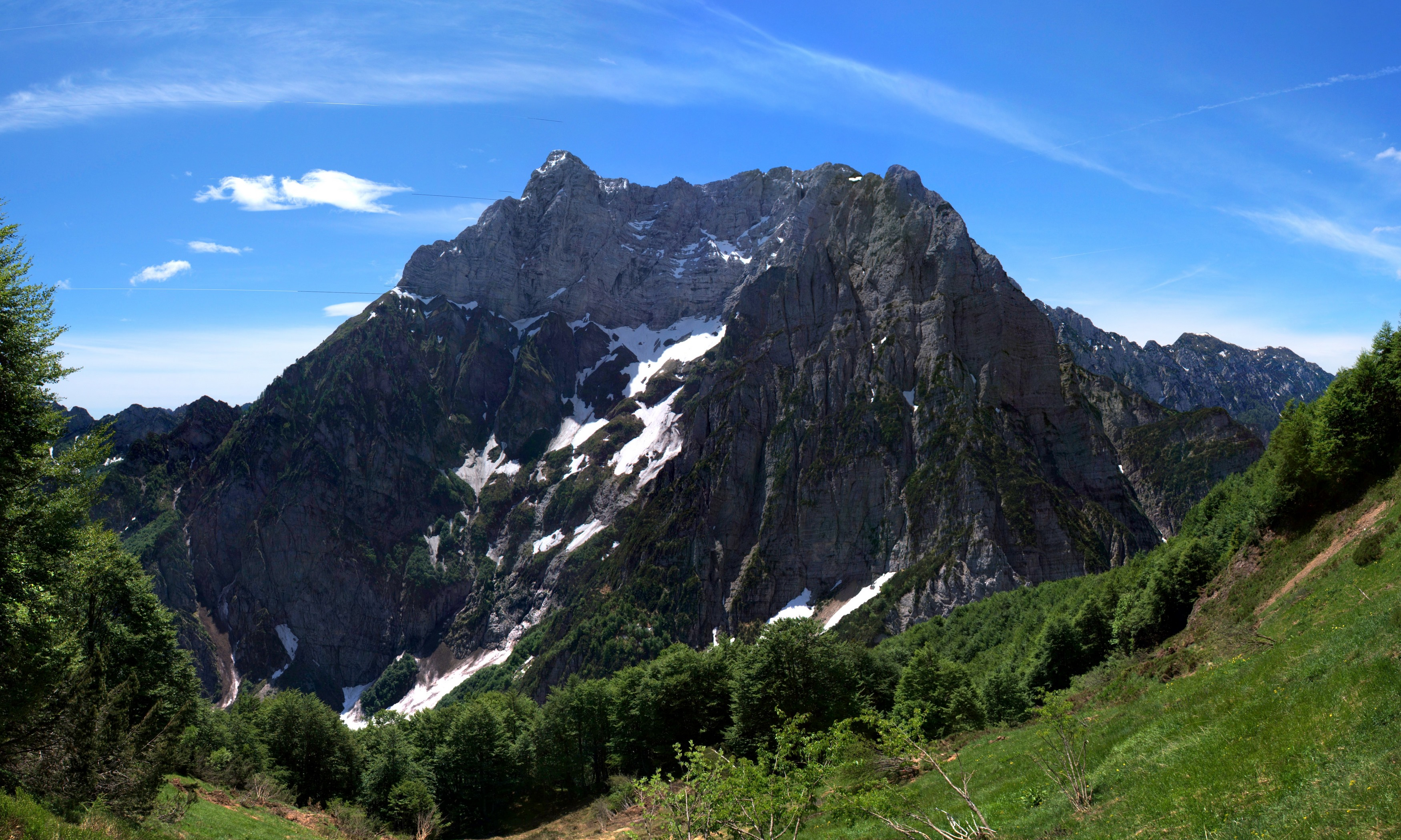
Northern slopes of Col Nudo

The chief summits of the Venetian prealps are:

Name	metres	feet
Col Nudo	2,471	8,107
Cima Dodici	2,341	7,680
Cima Portule	2,310	7,578
Gruppo della Carega - Cima Carega	2,259	7,411
Cima Palon	2,232	7,322
Catena delle Tre Croci - Monte Zevola	1,976	6,483
Monte Campomolon	1,853	6,079
Monte Grappa	1,775	5,823
Col Visentin	1,764	5,787

== Maps ==
- Italian official cartography (Istituto Geografico Militare - IGM); on-line version: www.pcn.minambiente.it

== See also ==
- Lessinia
