= Monte Cavallo =

Monte Cavallo may refer to:

- Monte Cavallo, Marche, a village in Italy
- Monte Cavallo (Rome), a former name of the Quirinal Hill
- Monte Cavallo (Orobie), a mountain in Lombardy
- Monte Cavallo (Bellunes Alps), a mountain in Friuli-Venezia Giulia and Veneto
