= Bellunes Alps =

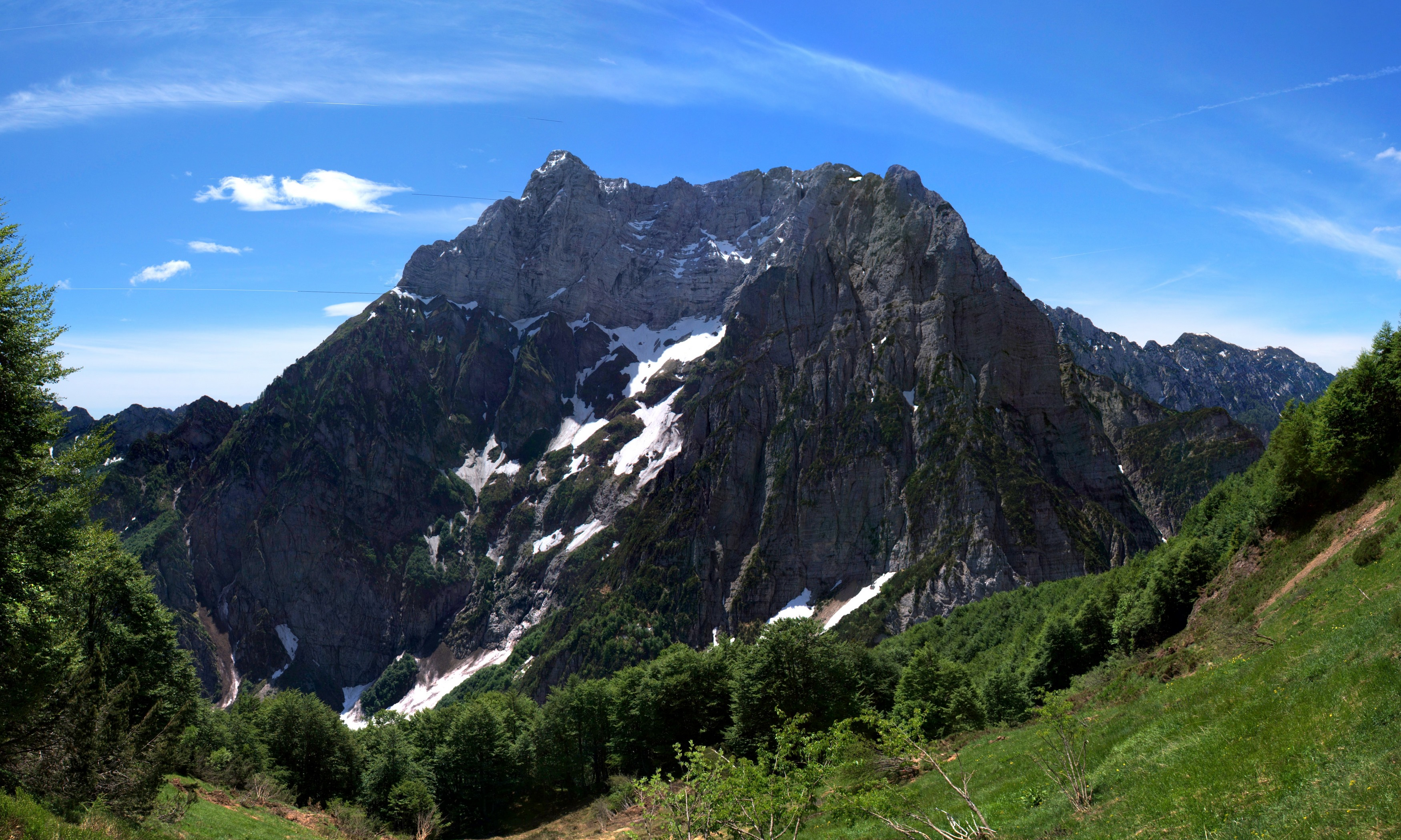
- Col Nudo, the highest peak in the Bellunes Alps

Highest point
- Peak: Col Nudo
- Elevation: 2,472 m s.l.m.

Geography
- Location within Alps
- State(s): Trentino-South Tyrol, Venetia; Italy
- Range coordinates: 46°10′19″N 12°07′00″E
- Parent range: Eastern Alps

The Bellunes Alps (German: Belluneser Alpen, Italian: Prealpi Bellunesi) is the now obsolete name of a mountain range on the southern edge of the Eastern Alps.

They lie in the Italian regions of Venetia and Trentino-South Tyrol. They cover the provinces of Treviso, Pordenone and part of Vicenza. The name is derived from the town of Belluno. Their highest peak is Col Nudo at 2,472 m s.l.m..

They are part of the Southern Limestone Alps, and are mainly made of the chalk limestone of the Southern Alps with summit region made of main dolomite.

The Bellunes Alps used to be an independent group in the Alpine Club Classification of the Eastern Alps (AVE) and had the number 55. In 1984 they were divided; the northern part being assigned to the Dolomites, and the southern part to the Southern Carnic Alps – the latter also appeared as the Bellunes Prealps (Belluneser Voralpen) in the Partizione delle Alpi where it formed Group 55d of the Venetian Alps (55). The northern part is also called the Bellunes Dolomites or Schiara Group, after its highest peak, Monte Schiara (2,565 m s.l.m.).

In 1990, the northern, dolomitic part was declare a national park: the Bellunes Dolomites National Park.
