= Dente Italiano =

Mountain in Trentino, Italy

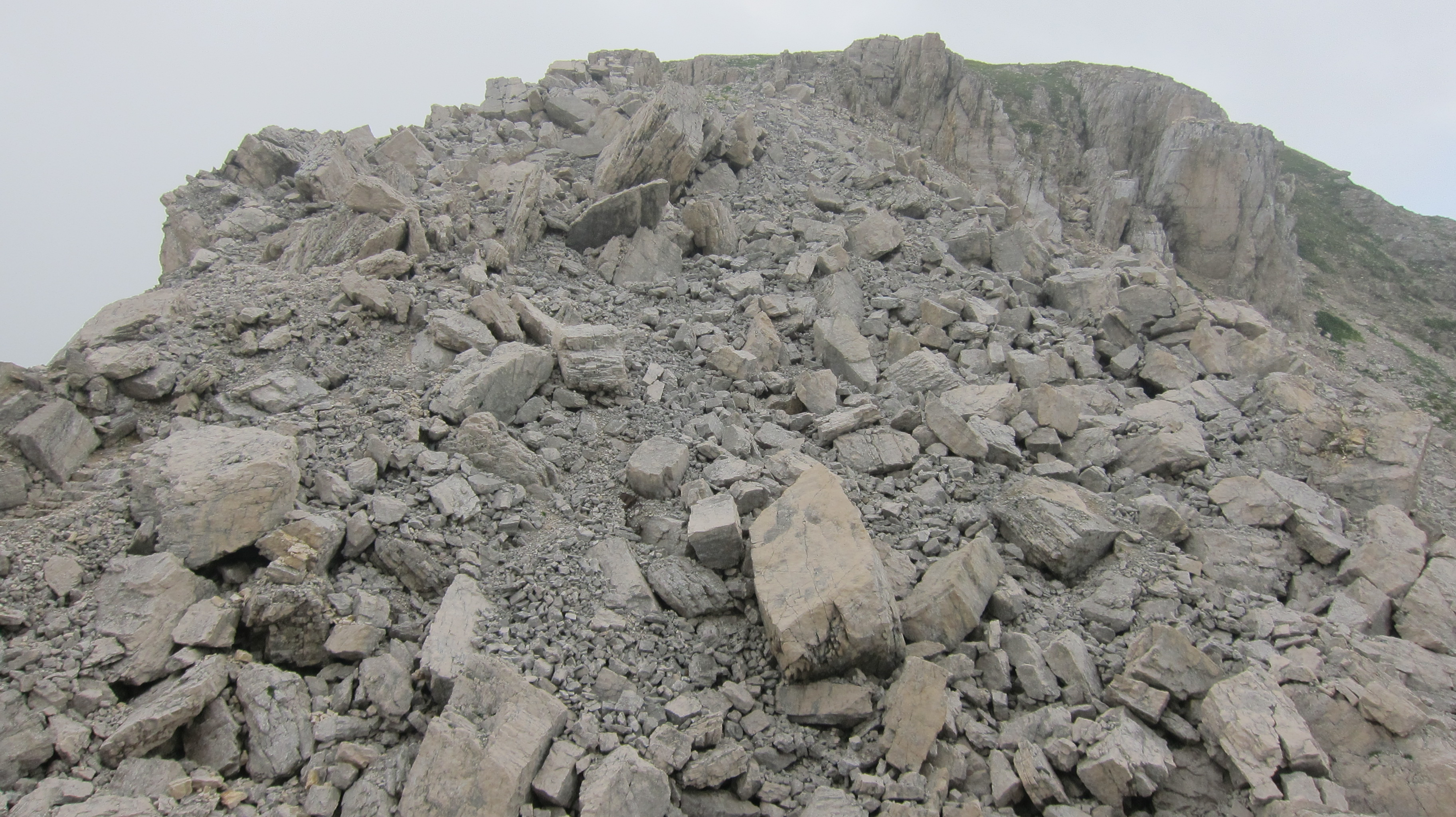
- Dente Italiano with the aftermath of the Austrian mine of March 13, 1918

Highest point
- Elevation: 2,220 m (7,280 ft)
- Coordinates: 45°47′40″N 11°10′34″E

Geography
- Location within Italy
- Location: Trentino
- Country: Italy
- Region: Trentino-Alto Adige/Südtirol
- Parent range: Vicentine Alps

Dente Italiano (German: Italienische Platte) (2220 m) is one of the ridges of the Pasubio summit highlands in the Vicentine Alps.

Located on the line of ridges between the Cosmagnon basin and the Pasubio Alps, to the south the Damaggio pass separates it from Cima Palon, to the north the Denti pass (for the Austro-Hungarians Eselsrücken i.e. donkey's back) separates it from the Austrian Dente.

== History ==
It was named so during World War I because it represented the front line at the highest part of the massif; while on the Austro-Hungarian side was the Austrian Dente.

=== The wartime events ===
Dente Italiano, at the beginning of World War I, became from the earliest days a strong point of the Royal Army on the Pasubio, occupied in the initial Austrian retreat to fortify the defense lines. However, during the Strafexpedition, the Habsburg Army advanced to the point of undermining Cima Palon, settling in early summer 1916 on the line between the Denti.

The battle of July 2, 1916, saw Lieutenant Salvatore Damaggio halt the enemy advance on the pass between Dente and Cima Palon, hence the name of the pass itself. During the mine war, Dente Italiano was dug not only to provide firing positions and shelters for the Italian army, but also in an attempt to creep under enemy positions on the Austrian Dente with the aim of blowing them up with explosives. However, the tunnels of Dente Italiano are often "counter-mine" tunnels, dug in a haphazard manner, without a precise plan, but following the sounds of the enemy's digging in an attempt to stop them. They therefore assume a tortuous course.

From September 29, 1917, to March 13, 1918, a total of ten mines were blasted, five by the Italians and as many by the Austro-Hungarians, hardly achieving the desired results:

N.	Date	Origin	Explosive charge	Notes	Casualties
1	September 29, 1917	Austro-Hungarian mine	500 kg	landmine	30 Italians (Note: Among the victims was Engineer Captain Leopoldo Motti, creator of the 52 Tunnel Road.)
2	October 1, 1917	Italian mine	16.000 kg	caused a crater 40 m in diameter and 10 m deep in the pass of the Denti	12 Austro-Hungarians
3	October 22, 1917	Italian mine	1000 kg	landmine	0
4	December 24, 1917	Austro-Hungarian mine	6.400 kg	mine under the northern spike of the Dente Italiano	50 Italians
5	January 21, 1918	Italian mine	600 kg	landmine	0
6	February 2, 1918	Austro-Hungarian mine	3.800 kg	caused serious damage to the Italian underground system	unknown
7	February 13, 1918	Italian mine	unknown	unintentionally caused the explosion of a second Italian mine	6 Austro-Hungarians and 2 Italians
8	February 24, 1918	Austro-Hungarian mine	unknown	landmine	0
9	March 5, 1918	Italian mine	unknown	landmine, provoked by the Austro-Hungarians in order to safely load the two blast chambers of the March 13 mine	0
10	March 13, 1918	Austro-Hungarian mine	50.000 Kg	caused the collapse of the northern part of the Dente Italiano	40 Italians and some Austro-Hungarians

The Austro-Hungarian mine that burst at 4:30 a.m. on March 13, 1918 with its 50,000 kg of explosives, loaded into two blast chambers under Dente Italiano, was the largest mine and caused the collapse of the northern part of it, which is still clearly visible today. It took 7 days just to load the two chambers.

The Austro-Hungarians' mine slightly anticipated an Italian mine that was to be detonated that same morning. For this reason, a good part of the Italian garrison had already abandoned the Dente when the Austro-Hungarian mine exploded, and the number of casualties was small. The gas explosions lasted for hours; until 11 a.m. 30 explosions were counted, some of which also involved the Austrian Dente, claiming some casualties among the Austro-Hungarians as well.

Following the March 13 mine, the ground under the Denti pass became so unstable that no further digging was possible, thus ending the mine war involving the Italian and Austrian Dente. The exact number of casualties from the mine war on the Denti varies in the literature. The figures were several times scaled down and are quite different from those published in the years immediately after the war, which spoke of hundreds and hundreds of casualties. The galleries of Dente Italiano are today partly collapsed, but accessible with due caution in their initial part. There is also the Papa Gallery that allowed an indoor connection with the nearby Cima Palon. In 1922 the Dente Italiano was proclaimed by royal decree a Sacred Zone, along with other areas of Pasubio.

For the centenary of the Great War, some artifacts and tunnels of the Dente Italiano were recovered and various information signs installed. During this work the Ghersi walkway was also restored, named after General Giovanni Ghersi, from July 1917 General Papa's successor in command of the Pasubio sector. The Ghersi walkway connected the Damaggio pass with the so-called Bombarde ridge and the underlying Commando pass near the Roman Arch.

== Image gallery ==
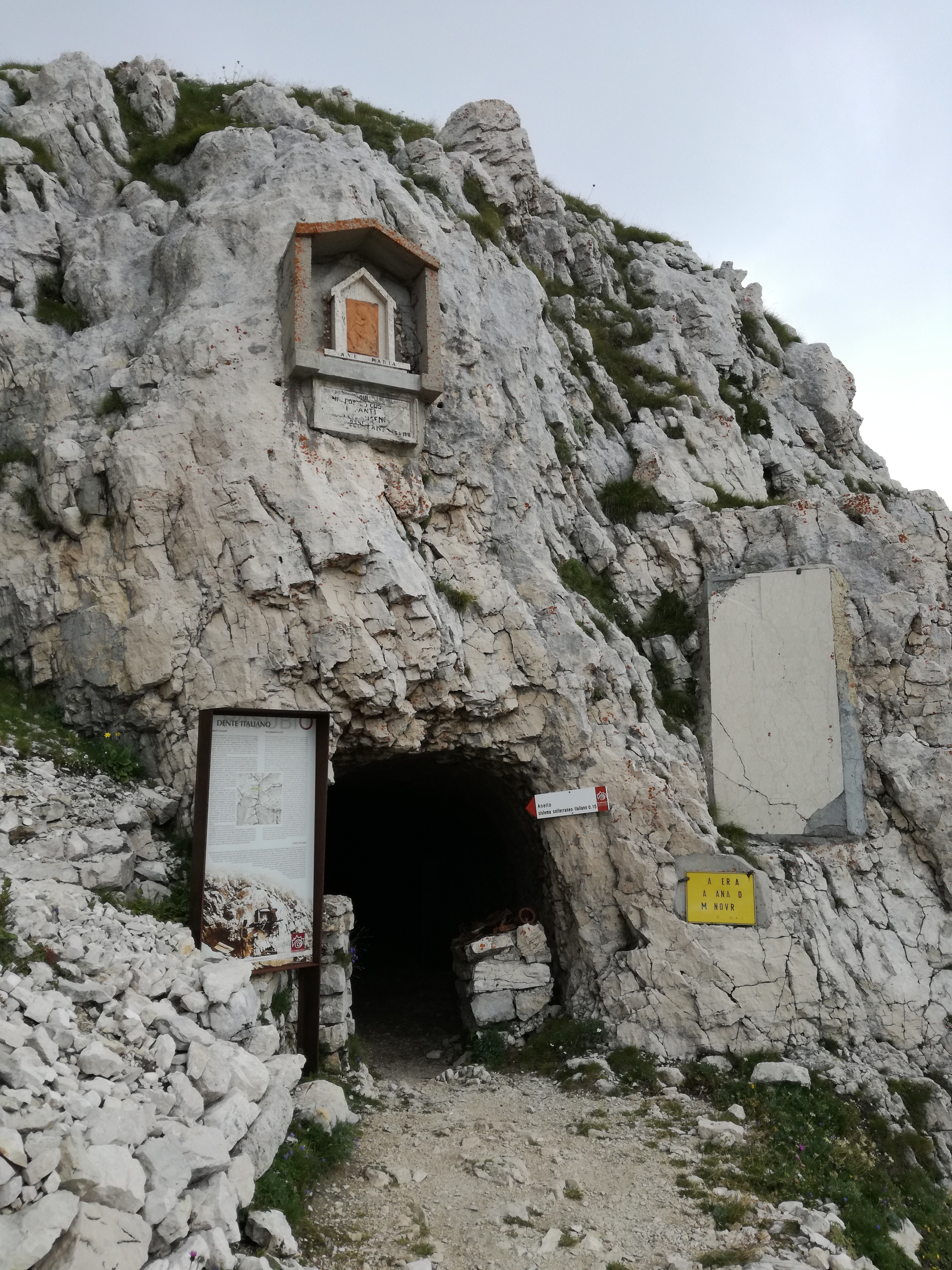
Entry to the underground system of Dente Italiano

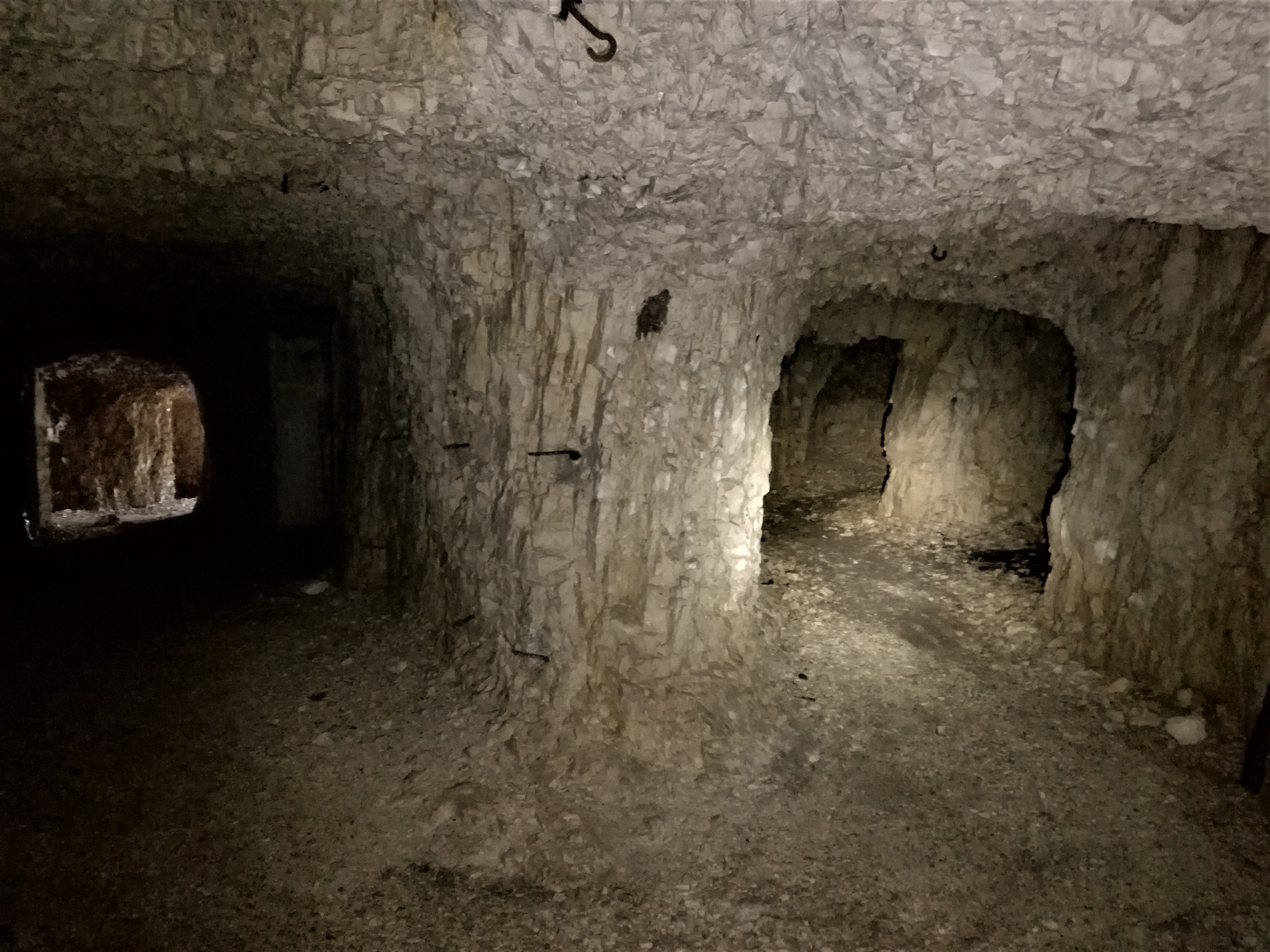
Tall tunnel of Dente Italiano

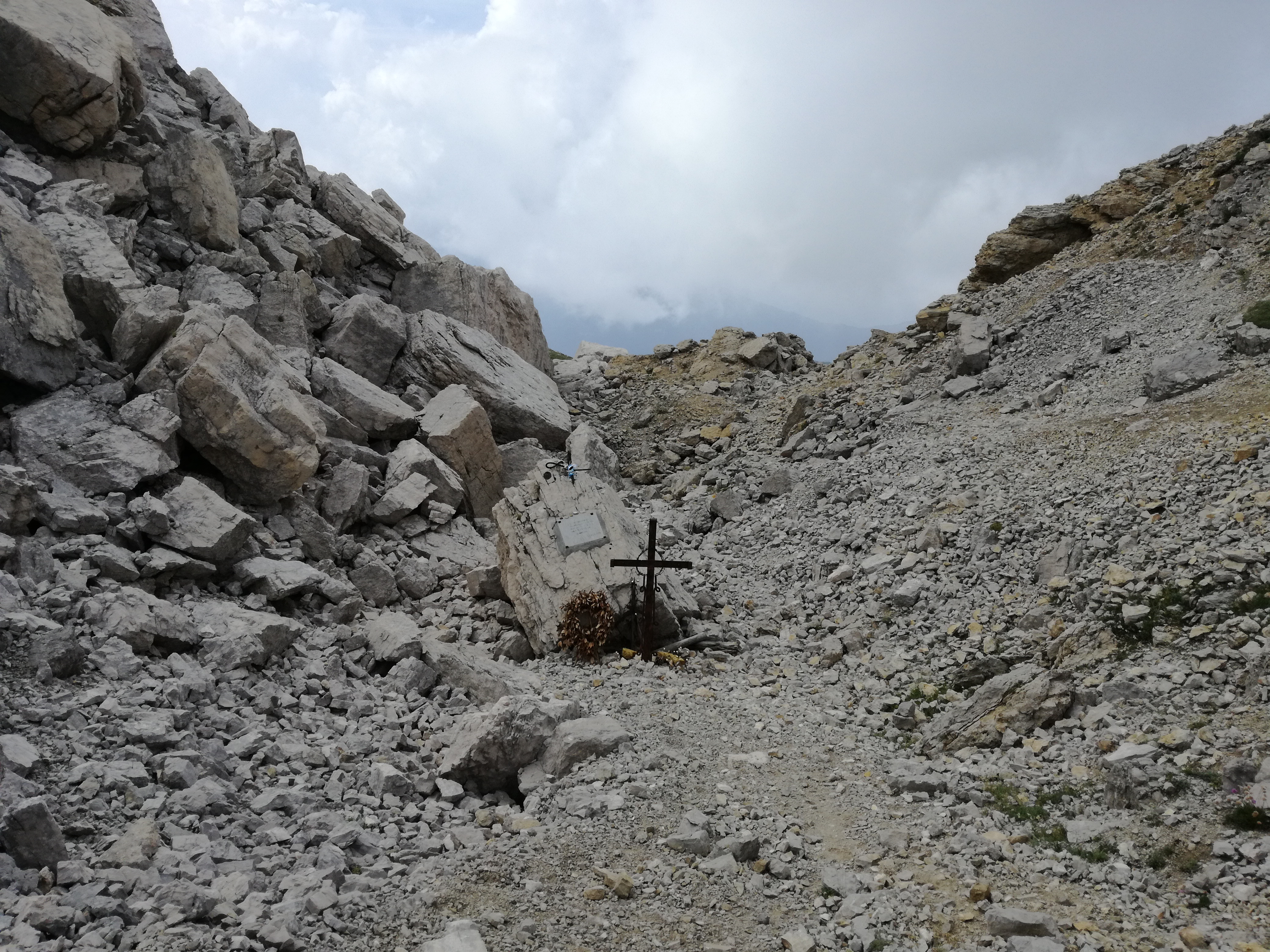
Mine crater in the pass of the Denti

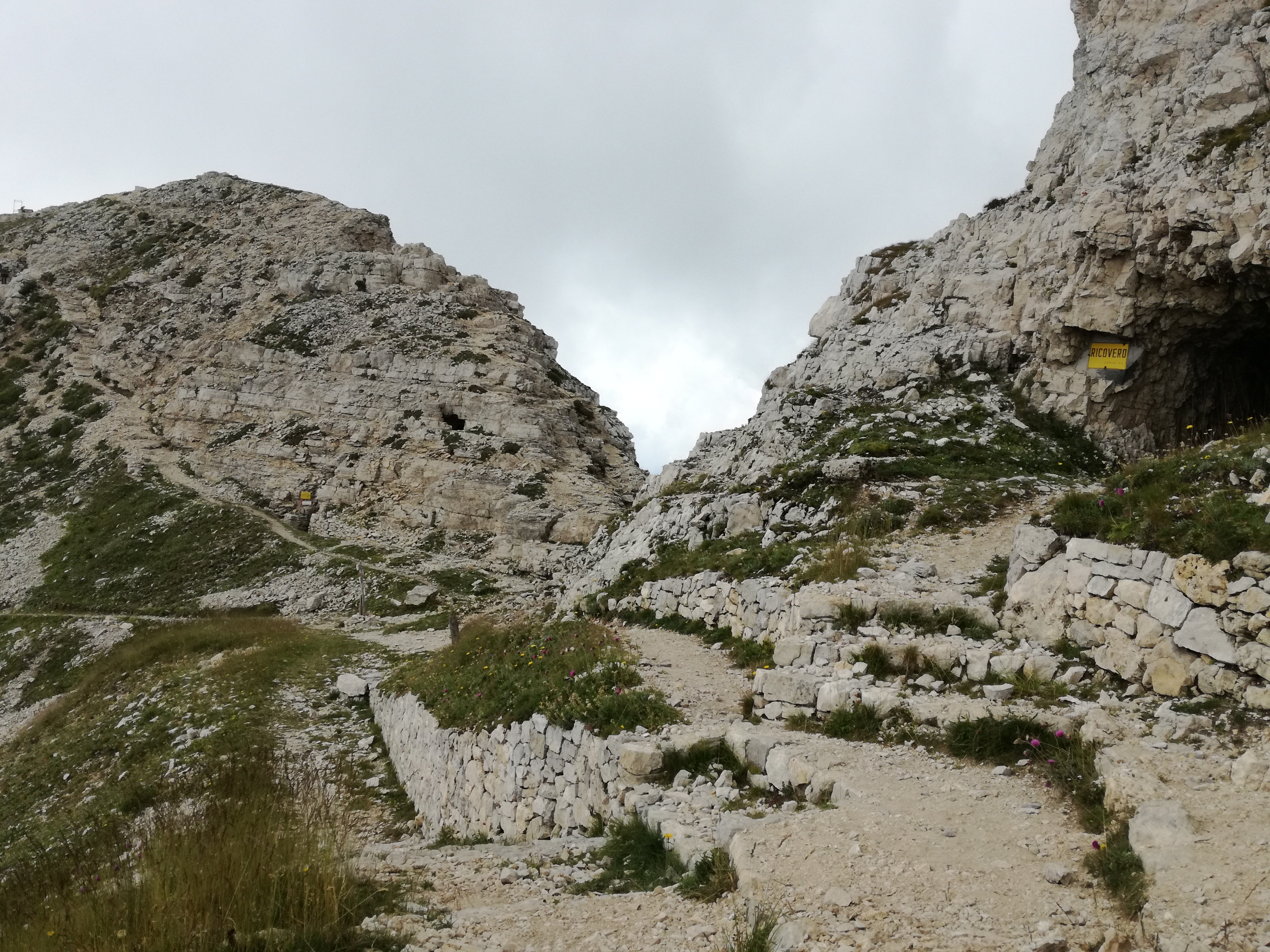
Damaggio pass with Cima Palon from the Dente Italiano

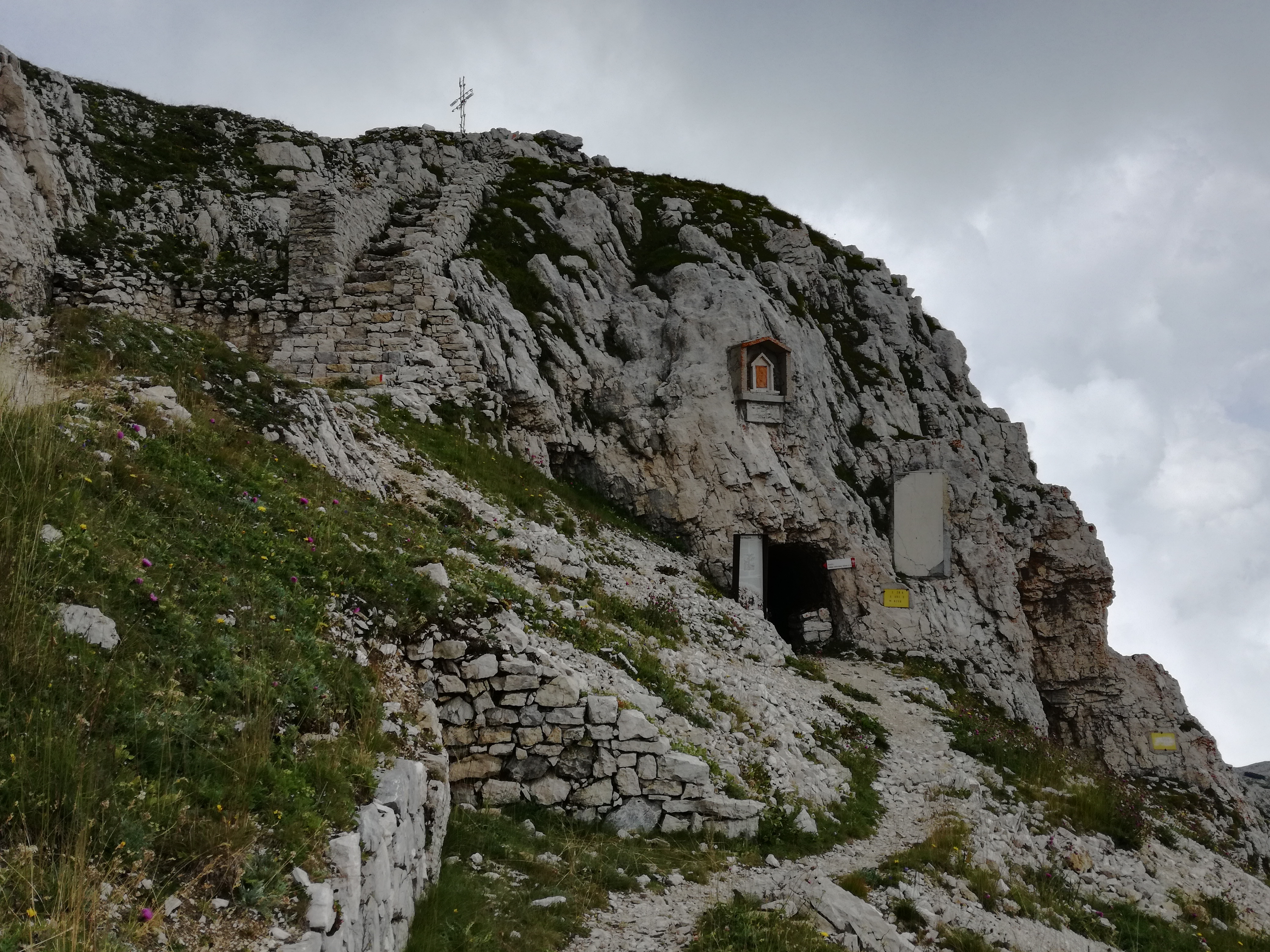
Southern side of Dente Italiano

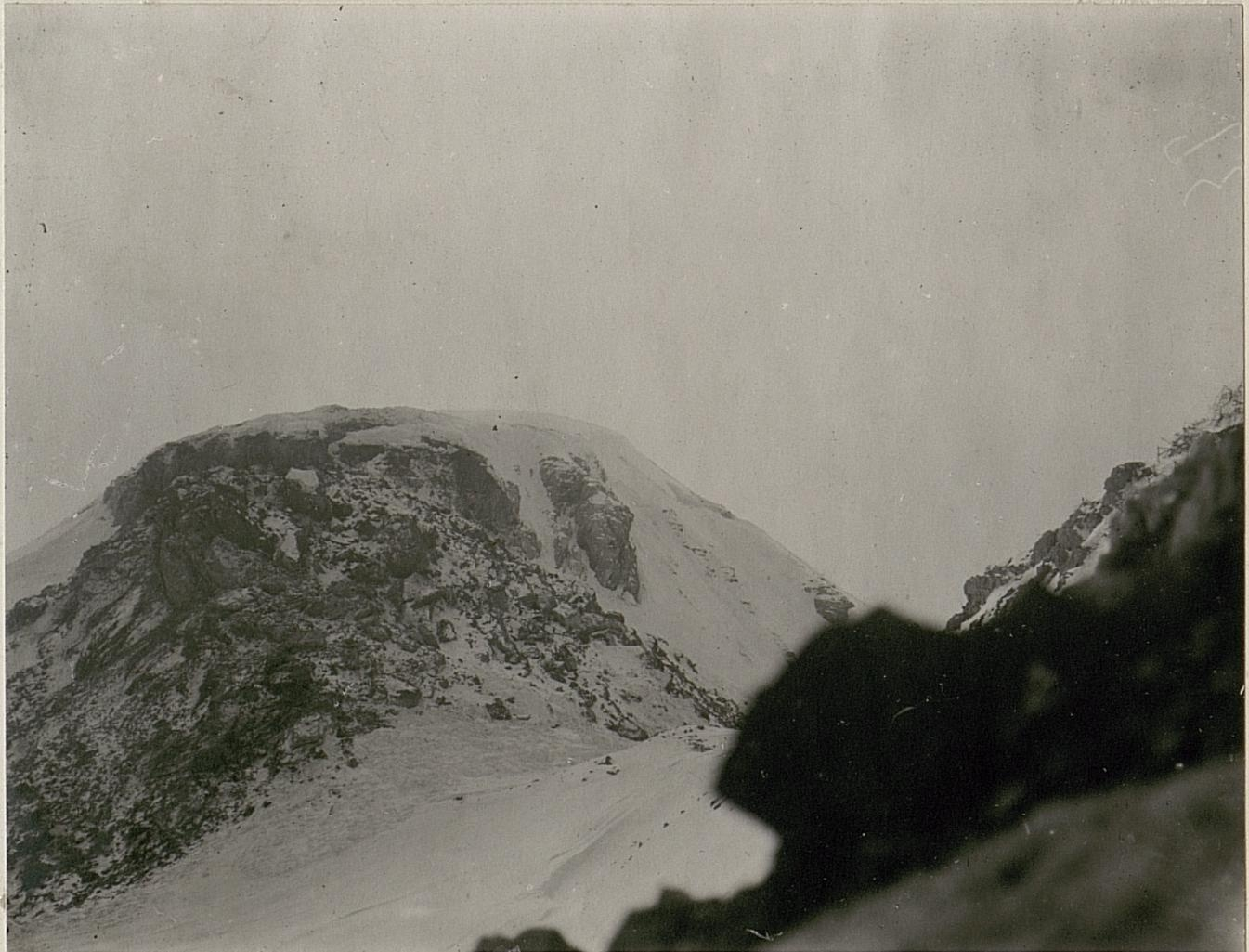
Vintage image of the Dente Italiano taken from the Austrian Dente after the big mine on March 13, 1918

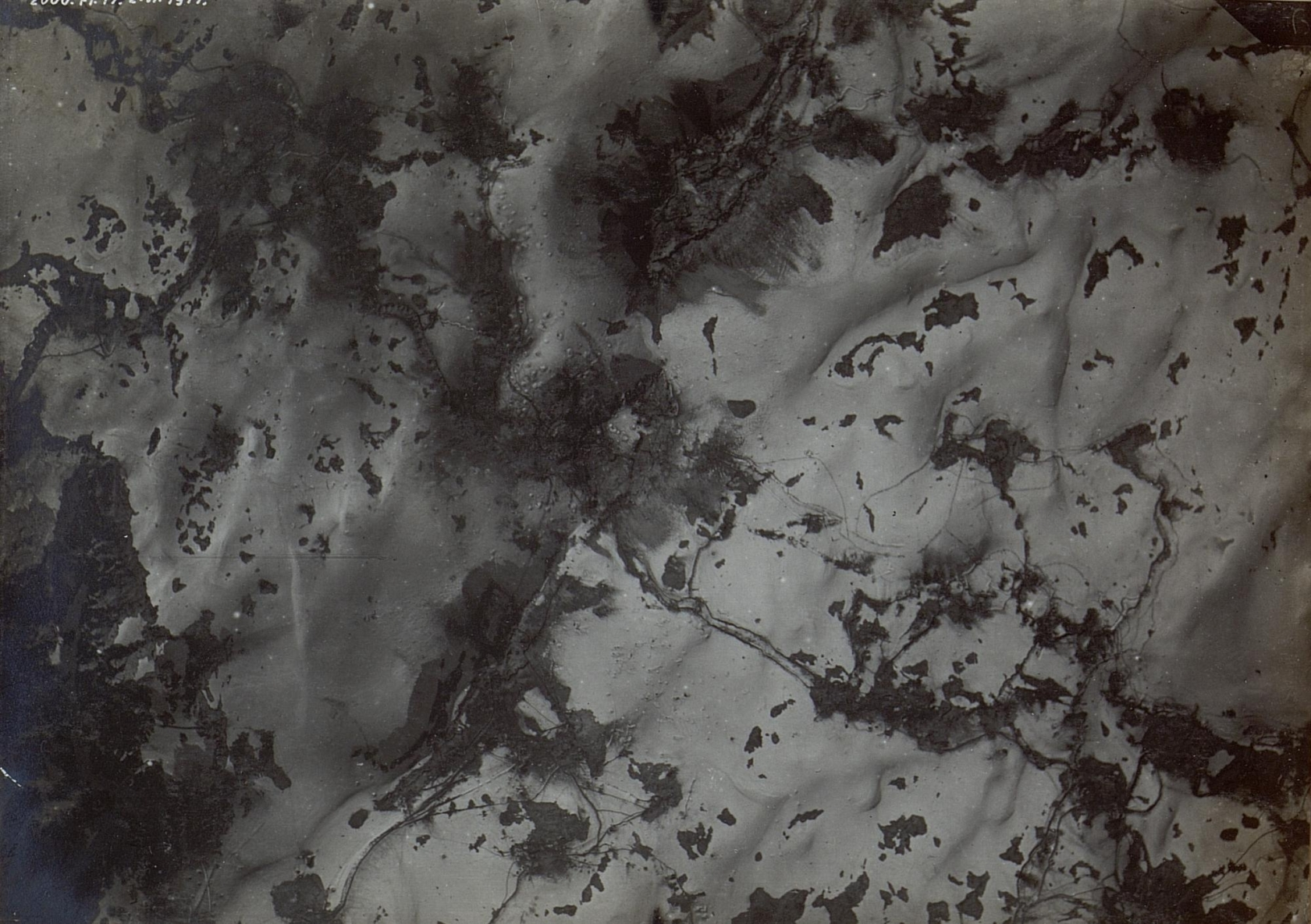
Photos from Austro-Hungarian aerial reconnaissance of the Cima Palon, Dente Italiano and Austrian Dente area (winter 1917/18)

== See also ==
- Vicentine Alps
- Cima Palon

== Bibliography ==
- Brunner, Moritz (1921). Zwei Beispiele über den Minenkampf im Hochgebirge (in German). Wien: Bundesministerium für Heerwesen.
- Michele Campana (2013). Un anno sul Pasubio. Novale di Valdagno: Rossato.
- Ugo Cassina (2018). Guerra di mine. Ricordi di un reduce del Pasubio (1917-1918). Novale di Valdagno: Rossato.
- Mario Ceola (1993). Pasubio eroico (ristampa anastatica). Rovereto: Museo storico italiano della guerra.
- Martino Di Basilio (2012). La guerra di mine sui fronti della Grande Guerra. Novale di Valdagno: Rossato.
- Carlo Ferrario (1935). La difesa del Pasubio e del Corno Battisti. Roma: Tipografia regionale.
- Gianni Pieropan (1990). Monte Pasubio: guida alla Zona sacra: itinerari, ambiente, storia. Novale di Valdagno: Rossato.
- Viktor Schemfil (2005). La grande guerra sul Pasubio: 1916-1918. Milano: Mursia.
- Striffler, Robert (1993). Le 34 mine fatte brillare sul fronte alpino tirolese 1916 - 1918. Rozzano: Società Storica per la Guerra Bianca.
- Vincenzo Traniello (1928). Il Pasubio e la guerra di mine. Rivista militare italiana.
