= Slavc =

Male wolf in Italy and Slovenia

- Slavc (right) with his first mate Juliet
- Species: Canis lupus
- Sex: Male
- Born: 2009; Slovenia, Slavnik Pack
- Died: Winter 2022-2023
- Weight: 40 kg (88 lb) at the age of 2 years old (2011-07-17)

Slavc (pronounced [ˈslawts], diminutive of Slavko) was a male wolf that was electronically tracked by the University of Ljubljana's Biology department between July 2011 and August 2012, as part the EU-funded SloWolf project.

Slavc was born as part of the Slavnik wolf pack, which ranges from Trieste in Italy, through Hrpelje-Kozina in Slovenia up to the Učka mountain range in Croatia. In July 2011, he was fitted with a GPS-GSM-VHF collar by the biologist Hubert Potočnik near Kozina, and his location was transmitted every three hours.

On 19 December, Slavc dispersed from his pack and headed southwards, towards Ćićarija, then proceeded northwards, traversing Vipava Valley, Trnova forest, then through Ljubljana Basin, subsequently reaching the vicinity of Klagenfurt within 10 days. The data transmitted by his collar suggested that Slavc had swum across the Drava river at a location where the river is 280 metres (920 ft) wide with no bridges nearby. Some of the mountain passes the wolf crossed were at elevations of 2,600 metres (8,500 ft) and with snow covers that were 6 metres (20 ft) deep. By March 2012 Slavc had arrived in the Valpolicella, part of Verona province in Italy. His sighting was the first of a wild wolf in Verona in more than 130 years. He then moved back north towards the Lessinia Regional Nature Park, where he formed a pair bond with a female nicknamed Juliet. The journey had seen Slavc travel for around 2,000 kilometres (1,200 mi) in total.

Slavc's collar was programmed to drop off automatically in August 2012. He was assumed to still be in Lessinia, where he had two pups with his mate. There were indications that the pair had birthed another litter in 2014. Juliet was thought to have been killed by members of a rival pack in mid-January 2022, with Slavc being sighted in July of that year with a new mate nicknamed Orecchio Mozzo (pronounced [oˈrekkjo ˈmottso], "nick ear"). The last verified sighting of Slavc occurred on 13 August 2022, and Orecchio Mozzo was later observed to be accompanied by another male, thus leading to the conclusion that Slavc had died sometime in the winter of 2022-2023.

== See also ==
- OR-7
- List of wolves
