= Monte Plische =

Mountain in Italy

Coordinates: 45°42′06″N 11°08′10″E

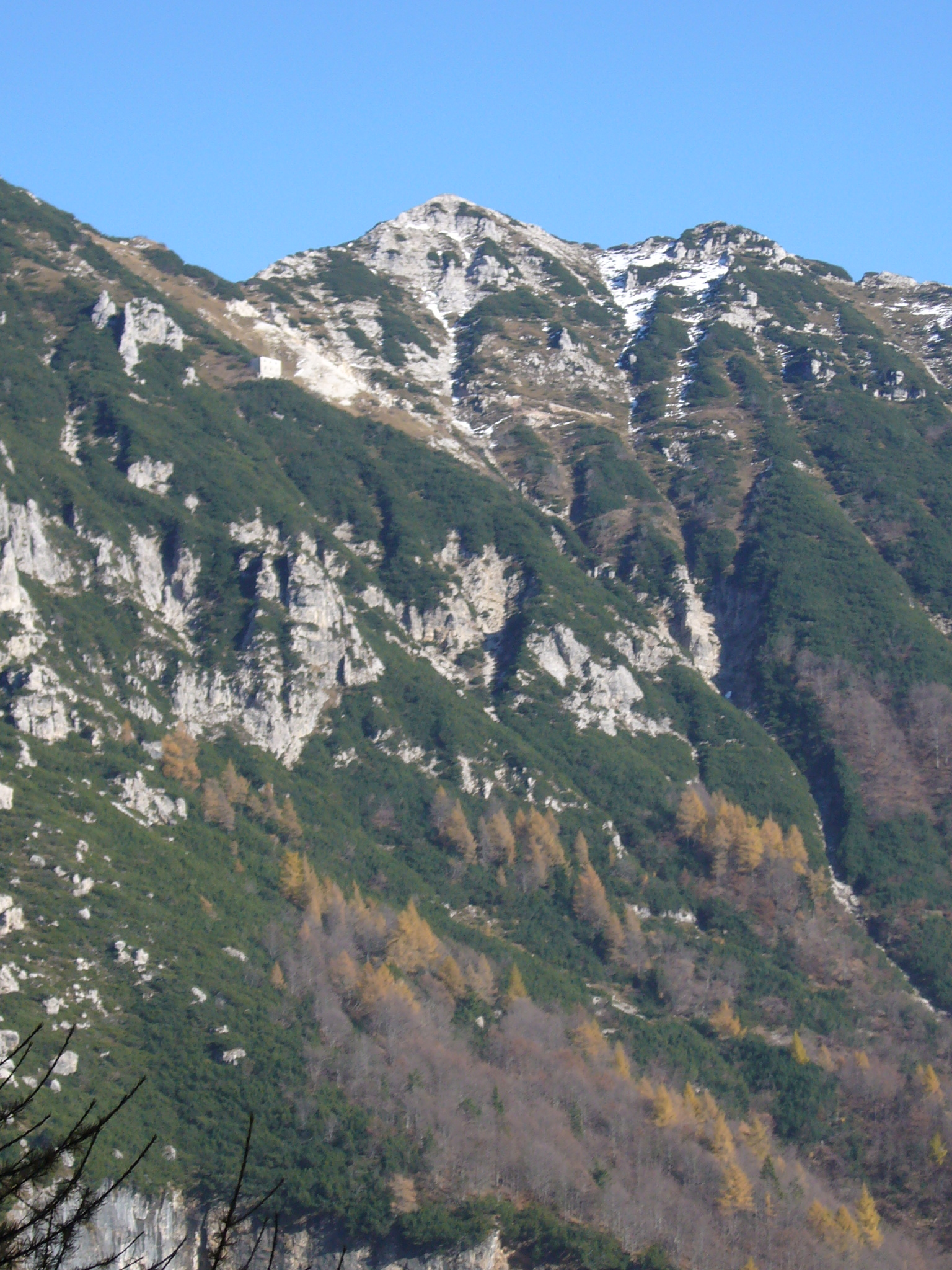

Highest point
- Elevation: 1,991 m (6,532 ft)

Geography
- Location: Veneto, Italy

Monte Plische is a mountain of the Veneto, Italy. It has an elevation of 1,991 metres.
