= Pic Morto =

- Location within Pyrenees

Highest point
- Elevation: 2,902 m (9,521 ft)
- Listing: Mountains of Catalonia
- Coordinates: 42°33′14.11″N 00°59′14.35″E

Geography
- Location: Pallars Jussà, Pallars Sobirà; Catalonia, Spain
- Parent range: Pyrenees

Climbing
- First ascent: Unknown
- Easiest route: From La Torre de Cabdella or Espot

Pic Morto is a mountain of Catalonia, Spain. Located in the Pyrenees, it has an elevation of 2,902 metres (9,521 ft) above sea level.
