= Cima Dodici =

Mountain in Italy

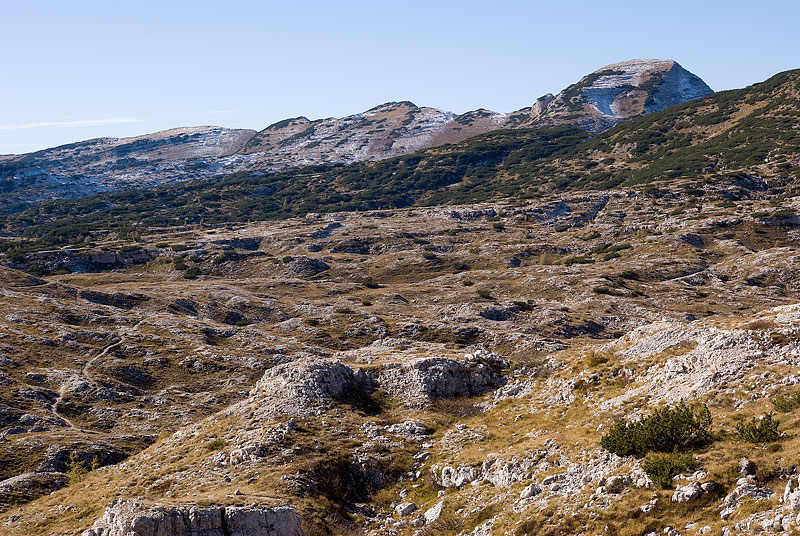

Highest point
- Elevation: 2,336 m (7,664 ft)
- Prominence: 1,874 m (6,148 ft)
- Listing: Alpine peaks by prominence; Ultra
- Coordinates: 45°59′51″N 11°28′05″E

Geography
- Location within Alps
- Location: Italy (Veneto and Trentino-Alto Adige)
- Parent range: Venetian Prealps

Cima Dodici (Italian for "peak 12", in Cimbrian language Freyjoch) is a mountain on the border of Vicenza in Veneto and Trentino in Trentino Alto Adige, northern Italy, south of the village of Borgo Valsugana. It has an elevation of 2,336 metres. and is the highest peak in Vicenza. At 1,874 m prominence, it is an ultra prominent peak. The key col is near the village of Pergine Valsugana.

== Climbing ==
The most direct access to the summit is from the valley of Galmarara, on the left hand side of the Val d'Assa. From the crossroads of the Galmarara hut (1614 m, reachable by car) the route continues via two old Austrian military roads, the Zoviellostraße (or, alternatively, the path 830) and the Kaiser Karl Straße. Just beyond the Bivio Italy (1987 m), a path leads to the summit.

The climb from Val di Sella is more difficult as it begins lower down the mountain. It goes via trail 211 which, starting from the road of Dosso, goes directly to the summit through the valley of the Twelve and the valley of the Trap. Alternatively, for the trail marked 231, which is detached from the former, it is a gradual climb up the valley of the Twelve to join up with the other path near the Busa Dodese bivouac.

From the summit the view sweeps over the eastern Alps, including the Brenta Dolomites, over to Pale di San Martino. The Adriatic Sea and The Apennines are visible to the south on a clear day.

On the top lie two summit crosses. The first, made from wood, was erected in 1946 to replace an earlier cross laid in 1900. The second, made up of metal pipes, was put up in 1973.

== SOIUSA classification ==
According to the SOIUSA (International Standardized Mountain Subdivision of the Alps) the mountain can be classified in the following way:

- main part = Eastern Alps
- major sector = Southern Limestone Alps
- section = Venetian Prealps
- subsection = Prealpi Vicentine
- supergroup = Gruppo degli Altipiani
- group = Altopiano dei sette comuni
- subgroup = Dorsale Cima Dodici-Ortigara
- code = II/C-32.I-A.3.b
