= Cima Portule =

Mountain in Italy

Coordinates: 45°58′N 11°26′E

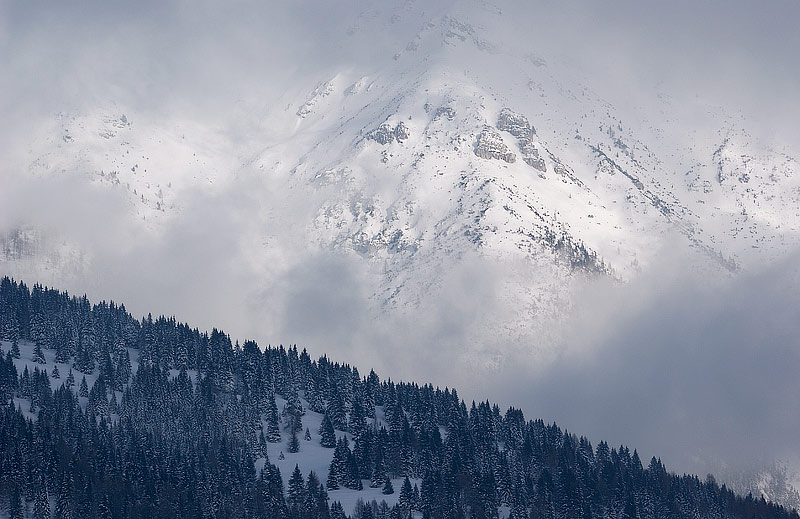
- Cima Portule from the west

Highest point
- Elevation: 2,308 m (7,572 ft)
- Prominence: 164 m (538 ft)

Geography
- Location: Veneto, Italy
- Parent range: Venetian Prealps

Cima Portule is a mountain in Italy, located in the province of Vicenza in the Veneto region. It has an elevation of 2,308 metres (7,572 ft).
