= Col Nudo =

Mountain in Italy

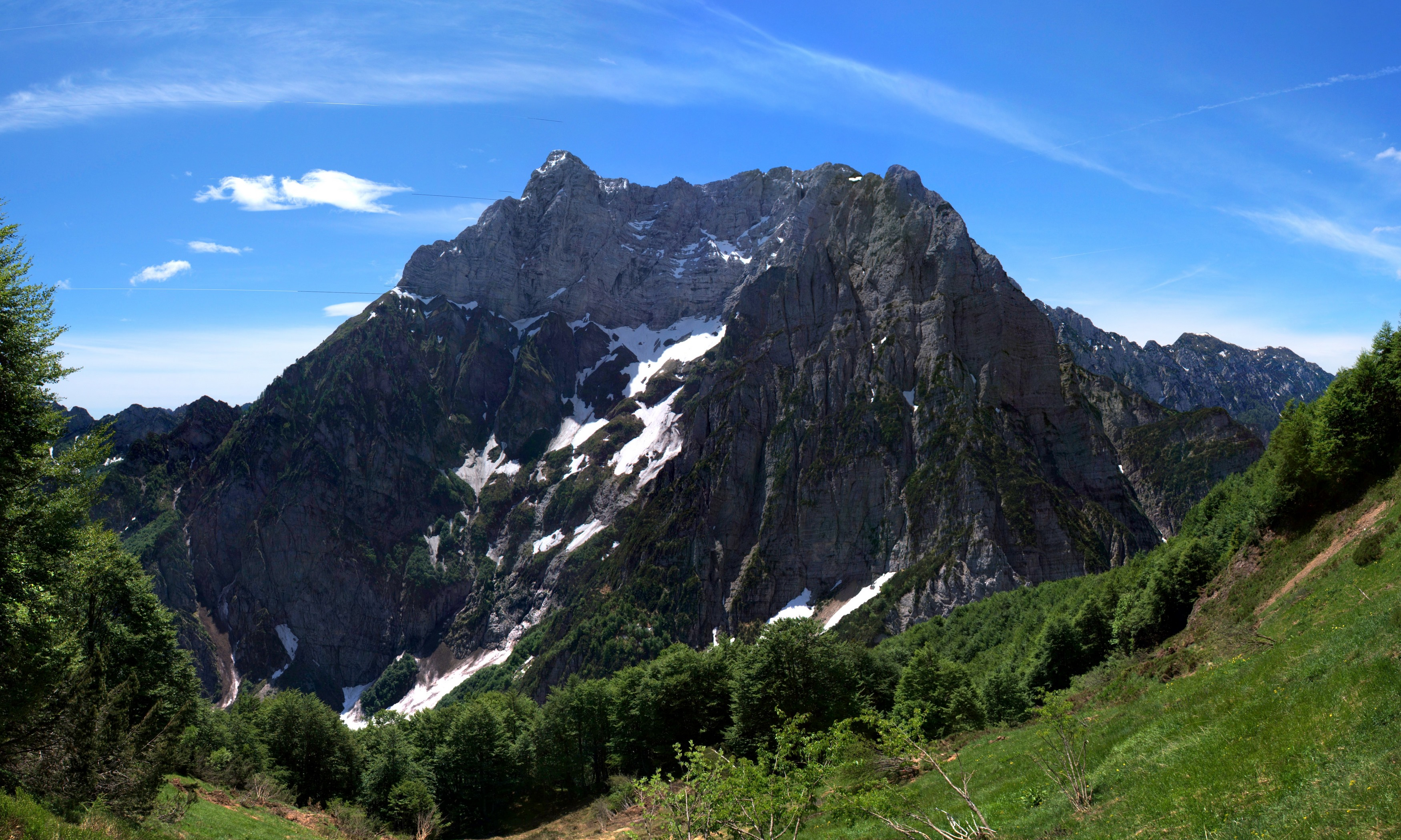
- Col Nudo northern slopes

Highest point
- Elevation: 2,471 m (8,107 ft)
- Prominence: 1,645 m (5,397 ft)
- Isolation: 11.11 km (6.90 mi)
- Listing: Alpine peaks by prominence; Ultra
- Coordinates: 46°13′44″N 12°24′05″E

Geography
- Location within Alps
- Country: Italy
- Regions: Veneto and Friuli-Venezia Giulia
- Parent range: Venetian Prealps

The Col Nudo is a mountain in the Alps located in Italy. It is the highest peak of the Venetian Prealps and the 30th most prominent summit of the Alps.

== Geography ==
Administratively the mountain is divided between the Italian regions of Friuli-Venezia Giulia (province of Pordenone) and Veneto (province of Belluno).

=== SOIUSA classification ===
According to SOIUSA (International Standardized Mountain Subdivision of the Alps) the mountain can be classified in the following way:

- main part = Eastern Alps
- major sector = Central Eastern Alps
- section = Venetian Prealps
- subsection = Prealpi Bellunesi
- supergroup = Catena Cavallo-Visentin
- group = Gruppo Col Nudo-Cavallo
- subgroup = Sottogruppo del Col Nudo
- code = II/C-32.II-B.2.a
