= Lago Morto =

Lake in Veneto, Italy

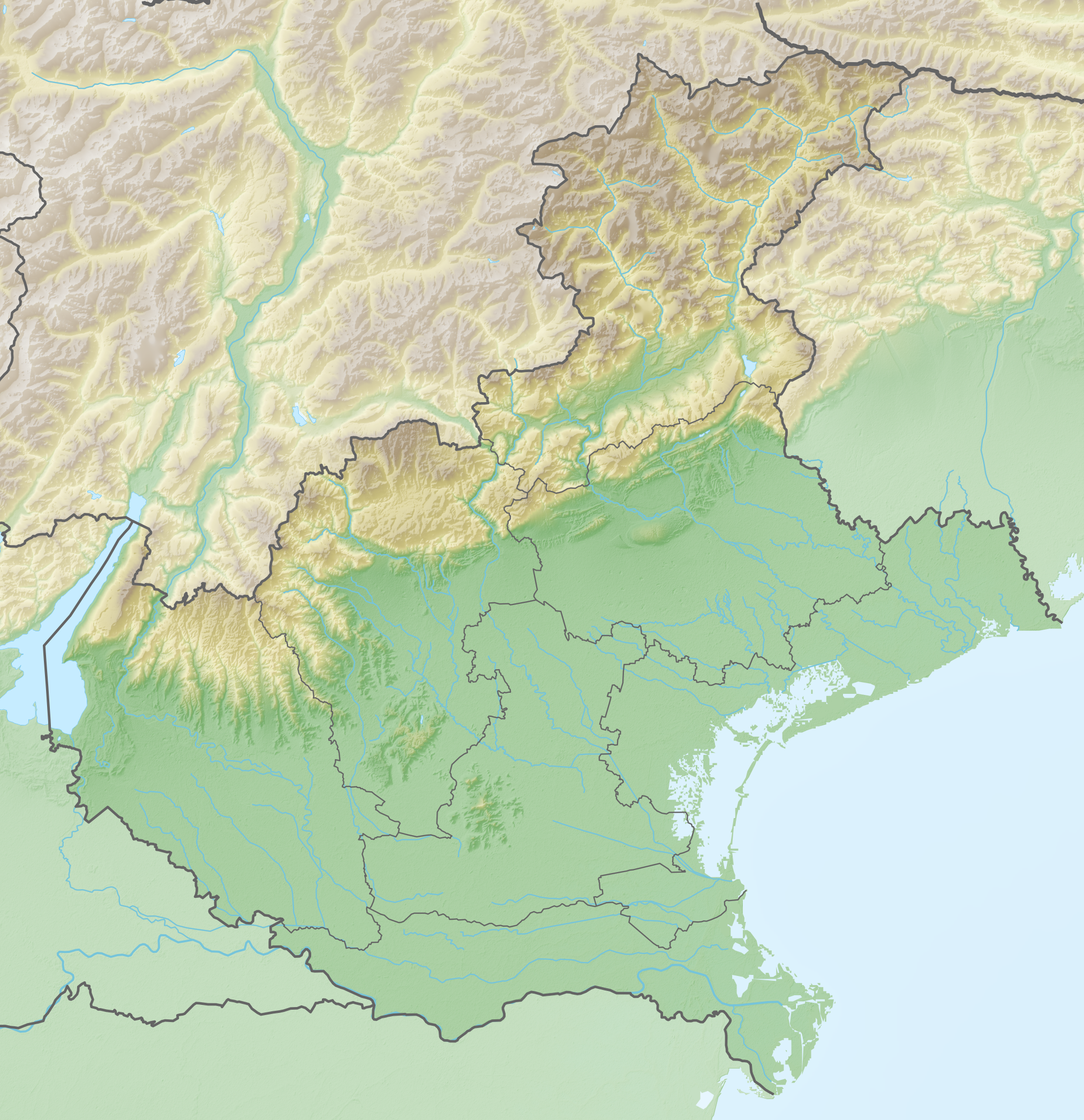
- Location within Veneto
- Location: Province of Treviso, Veneto
- Coordinates: 46°03′36.00″N 12°19′16.00″E
- Basin countries: Italy
- Surface elevation: 273 m (896 ft)

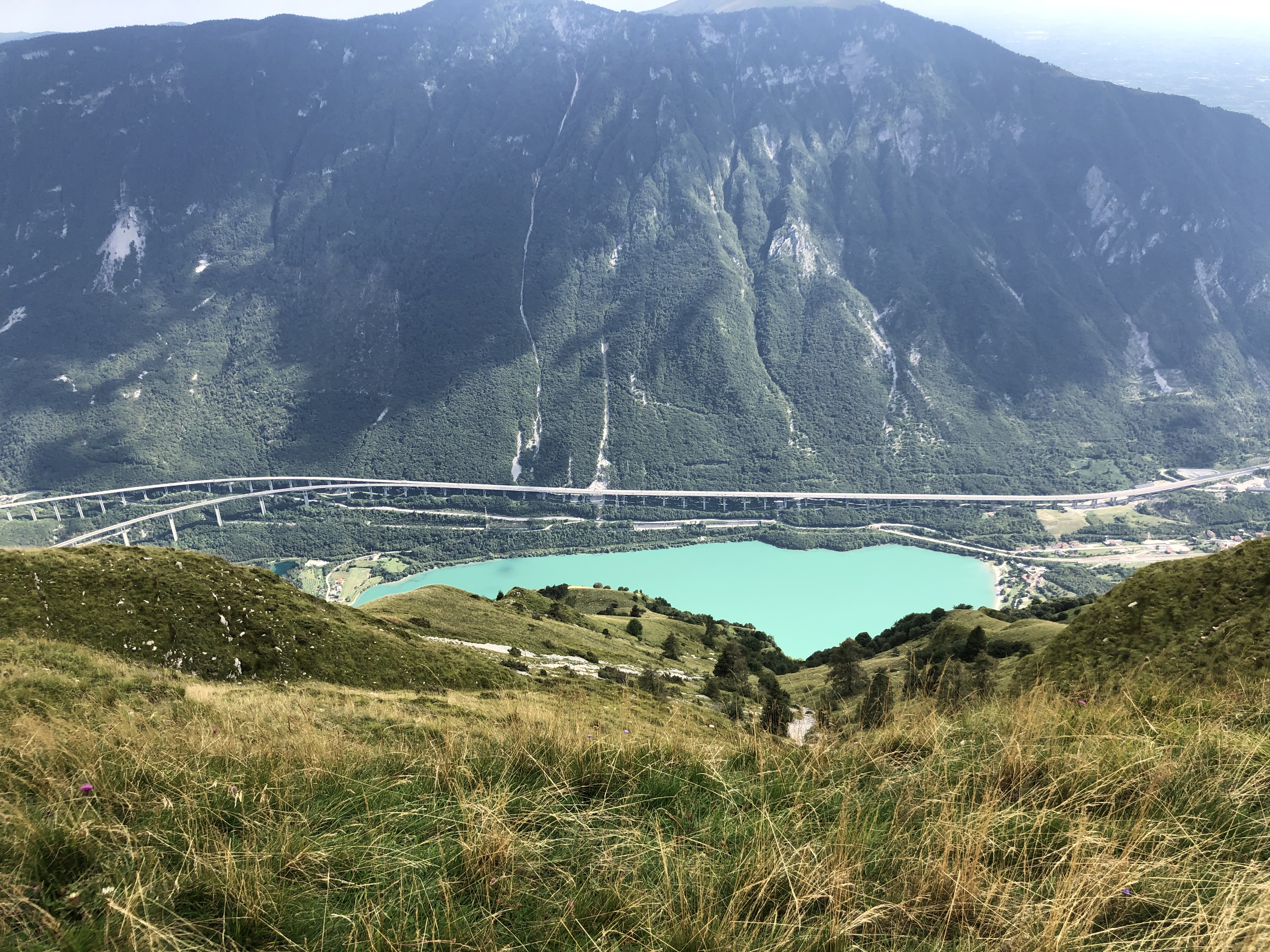
Lago Morto

Lago Morto (Italian for "dead lake") is a lake in the Province of Treviso, Veneto, Italy. It has this name because it has no effluent nor surface rivers feeding it, being fed probably by an underground karst river.

== Direction ==
Lago Morto is approximately 8 km (10 minutes by car) from Vittorio Veneto. This swimming lake has extensive views, a small playground for children and a large lawn. There is a walk around the lake of about 7 km. The route is suitable for mountain bikes.
