= Catena delle Tre Croci =

Mountain in Italy

- Location within Italy

Highest point
- Elevation: 1,976 m (6,483 ft)
- Coordinates: 45°41′20″N 11°08′36″E

Geography
- Location: Veneto, Italy

Catena delle Tre Croci is a mountain of the Veneto, Italy. Popular for hiking and other alpine activities, it has an elevation of 1,976 metres.
