= Monte Zevola =

Mountain in Italy

Coordinates: 45°41′20″N 11°08′36″E

Highest point
- Elevation: 1,976 m (6,483 ft)

Geography
- Location: Veneto, Italy

Monte Zevola (Italian pronunciation: [ˈmonte dˈdzeːvola]) is a mountain of the Veneto, Italy. It has an elevation of 1,976 metres.
