= Fregona =

- Comune
- Comune di Fregona
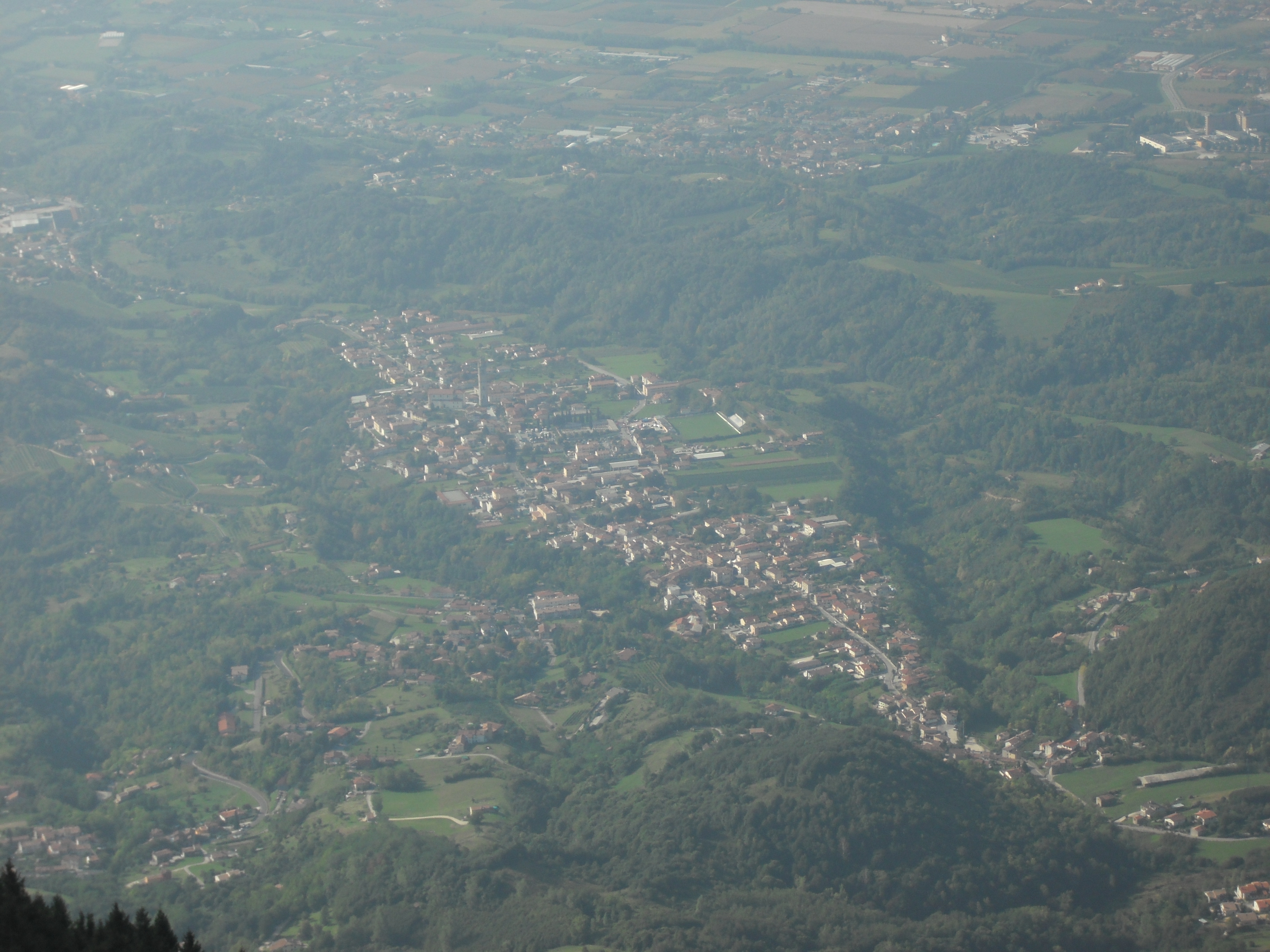
- Aerial view of Fregona

- Location within Italy Location within Veneto
- Coordinates: 46°0′N 12°20′E
- Country: Italy
- Region: Veneto
- Province: Treviso (TV)
- Frazioni: Osigo, Luca, Piai, Sonego, Breda, Colors, Crosetta, Fratte, Mezzavilla, Piadera, Valsalega.

Government
  - Mayor: Giacomo De Luca

Area
  - Total: 42.9 km^{2} (16.6 sq mi)

Population (31 December 2025)
  - Total: 2,738
  - Density: 63.8/km^{2} (165/sq mi)
- Demonym: Fregonesi
- Time zone: UTC+1 (CET)
  - Summer (DST): UTC+2 (CEST)
- Postal code: 31010
- Dialing code: 0438
- Patron saint: St. George and St. Daniel (Osigo), St. Martin (Mezzavilla)
- Website: Official website

Fregona is a comune (municipality) in the Province of Treviso in the Italian region of Veneto, located about 60 kilometres (37 miles) north of Venice and about 40 km (25 mi) north of Treviso. It is a scattered municipality, as the municipal seat is the Mezzavilla hamlet.

Fregona borders the following municipalities: Caneva, Cappella Maggiore, Cordignano, Alpago, Sarmede, Tambre, Vittorio Veneto.

== Physical geography ==
The municipal territory extends across the foothills northeast of Vittorio Veneto and across a large portion of the Cansiglio plateau, including some of the surrounding peaks; specifically, Pizzoc (1,565 m) and Millifret (1,581 m), the highest point in the municipality. The rest of the towns are located in a hilly area, rarely exceeding 600–700 m.

The area is rich in springs and waterways, among which the Carron stream stands out, rising at the foot of Pizzoc and flowing immediately east. Other noteworthy streams include the Friga, its tributary the Vizza, and the Caglieron with its caves, a fascinating complex consisting of a natural gorge and several quarries from which sandstone (locally known as piera dolza) was once mined. Also worthy of mention is Lake Madruc, a small artificial body of water located near Fratte.

The Cansiglio is a location of invaluable natural heritage, and the Fregona region in particular is safeguarded by several protected areas: the Piaie Longhe-Millifret Integral Nature Reserve, the Campo di Mezzo-Pian di Parrocchia State Reserve, and the Bus della Genziana Nature Reserve, a rare example of a speleological reserve.

== History ==
Human presence in Fregona dates back at least to the Iron Age, proven by the remains of tools. The area was very favorable for settlement, favored by its sunny position, abundant water resources, and the protection afforded by the mountains. The area was also civilized under the Romans: traces of this remain in the toponymy and in some coins dating back to the rules of Tiberius and Maximinus Thrax. The origin of Fregona's name is unknown: it may derive from a Germanic anthroponym, Fridrich, which became Federico in Italian, shortened to Frigo, from which the augmentative Frigón. It may also come from the Friga Torrent (perhaps from the Lombardic root word *rig meaning “furrow" or "canal”. The hypothesis that it derives from the Latin: frīgŭs meaning “cold" or “fresh,” with a suffix, should be considered paretymological.

The toponym could also refer to the presence of an ancient sacred area dedicated to Frigg/Freja, an important Germanic fertility deity, and date back to the centuries of Gothic and Lombard domination, when barbarian populations of uncertain ethnicity settled in the area of Vittoriese, where the Lombard Duchy of Ceneda was also established. The hydronyms Friga and Vizza, as well as the oronym of Monte Pizzoc, seem to confirm a more than marginal past presence of Germanic populations in the area. A limited, but confirmed, veneration of pagan cults that occurred among these people is also at the basis of the famous legend of Saint Augusta: that the saint, born in Fregona near the Castle of Piai, was the daughter of a pagan king named Madruch.

Once owned by the bishops of Belluno, Fregona later fell under the rule of the da Montanara counts, who had built a fortress on what is now Monte Castello, in Piai. The Montanara family later moved to Camino di Oderzo, taking the name da Camino. After the death of Rizzardo VI da Camino, Fregona followed the fate of Serravalle and passed to the Serenissima in 1337.

During the War of the League of Cambrai, in 1509, a group of heroic Fregonesi, recruited by Francesco Forte, freed Serravalle from the troops of Maximilian of Habsburg. Venice rewarded the town with a ducal document, still preserved in the town hall, which offered the community numerous privileges, which remained in force until the fall of the Republic in 1797.

== Monuments and places of interest ==
=== Parish Church ===
The Parish Church is dedicated to the Assumption of Mary and has ancient origins, but was rebuilt in 1474 and reconsecrated the following year. Between 1797 and 1820, it was rebuilt in its current form and reconsecrated in 1833. The bell tower, constructed with blocks of stone extracted from local quarries and completed in 1903, is noteworthy, as is the organ, which was created by Zuane Limana I. 1783.

First mentioned in a papal bull of 1182, the parish had its origin in the parish of Sant'Andrea di Bigonzo, from which it separated before the year 1000. It originally encompassed a much larger territory than the current one, extending to Cappella Maggiore (separated in 1494), Montaner (1600), Osigo (1865), and Sonego (1951). It was probably originally located in the small church of San Martino di Mezzavilla, which also had its own cemetery.

=== Venetian Villas ===
Below is a list of Venetian villas in the municipality of Fregona:

- Villa Trojer Lucheschi De Mori Salvador (17th century)
- Casa Fossa (Fratte, 17th century)
- Villa Dal Cin Giacomini Zanente Giustiniani (Osigo, 15th century)
- Villa Da Cason De Lorenzi Uliana Pizzol (Fratte, 17th century)
- Villa Altan Pancetti (Fratte, 18th century)
- Villa Salvador (Fratte, 18th century)

== Demographic evolution ==
Historical population

Year	Pop.	±%
1861	?	—
1871	3,049	—
1881	3,054	+0.2%
1901	3,393	+11.1%
1911	3,941	+16.2%
1921	4,443	+12.7%

Year	Pop.	±%
1931	4,186	−5.8%
1936	3,763	−10.1%
1951	3,742	−0.6%
1961	3,538	−5.5%
1971	3,077	−13.0%
1981	2,910	−5.4%

Year	Pop.	±%
1991	2,936	+0.9%
2001	2,927	−0.3%
2011	3,169	+8.3%
2021	2,815	−11.2%

Source: Data from ISTAT

=== Ethnic groups and foreign minorities ===
As of January 1st, 2025 there were 164 foreigners residing in the municipality, making up 5.9% of the population. The largest foreign community is Moroccan, making up 22% of all foreigners present in the area, followed by Romanian and Ukrainian citizens.

== Human geography ==
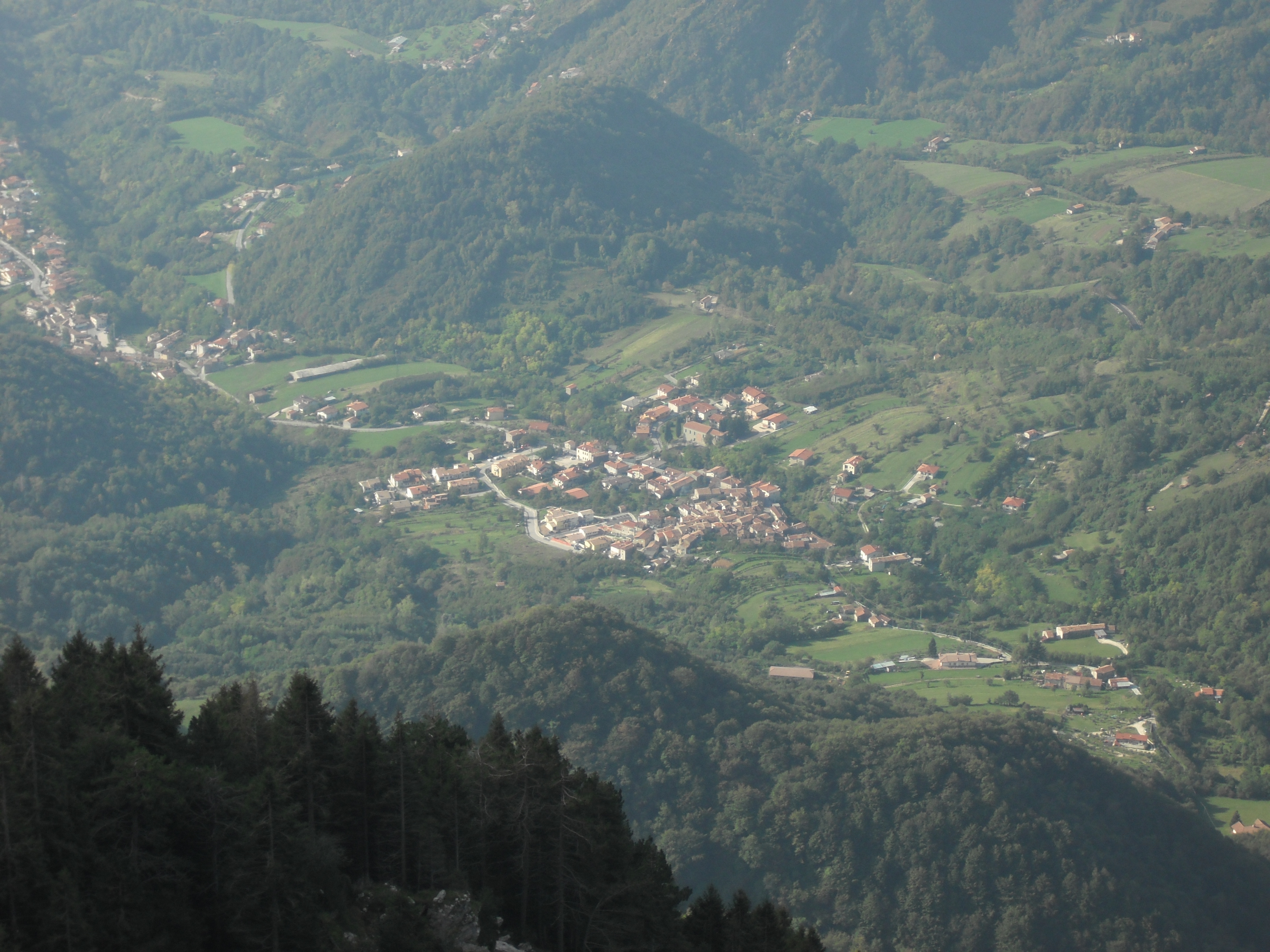
Sonego seen from Pizzoc

The municipal statute does not list any hamlets or localities, however, the municipality is made up of numerous villages and hamlets of which the most important is Fregona, ssumption is located), which today also includes some localities located further north which were once distinct, such as Mezzavilla (where the town hall is located), Piai (342 m) and Sonego (425 m).

The following are still separated from the municipality:

- Breda (288 m, pop. 36): a small village west of Mezzavilla, near the Caglieron caves, in the heart of the Cansiglio karst massif.
- Buse (155 m, pop. 21): a tiny village between Fratte and Montaner di Sarmede.
- Ciser (450 m, pop. 31): a small village west of Sonego.
- Col d'Osigo (263 m, pop. 26): a small village southeast of Osigo.
- Fratte (170 m, pop. 228): the southernmost village, located just beyond Anzano di Cappella Maggiore. It developed along the current Via Fratte (SP 422) and to the left of the Carron stream, and a modest industrial area is located there.
- Luca (354 m, population 59): a village beyond Osigo, towards Montaner di Sarmede. It sits on a hill overlooking the Veneto plain, and the small church dedicated to San Luca is of historical interest.
- Osigo (327 m, population 544): the second most populous town, east of Mezzavilla.
- Piai (342 m): lies immediately north of Mezzavilla, just before Sonego.
- Sonego (425 m): another large village north of Mezzavilla.

Fregona is the municipality with the lowest population density in the province of Treviso. The pretty town is emptying, like many others in these parts, as the local population is having fewer children and residents are increasingly migrating to larger cities or moving abroad.

== Administration ==
Period		Office holder	Party	Title	Notes
9 June 2024	in office	Giacomo De Luca	Civic list La civica	Mayor	

== Twin towns ==
Fregona is twinned with:

- Seyssel, Ain, France, since 1992
- Court-Saint-Étienne, Belgium
