= Montaner (disambiguation) =

Montaner is a commune in the Pyrénées-Atlantiques department, France.

Montaner may also refer to:

== Places ==
- Montaner, Italy, in the region of Veneto

== People ==
- Alejandro Montaner, Venezuelan singer and son of singer Ricardo Montaner
- Concepción Montaner (born 1981), Spanish long jumper
- Francisco "Paquito" Montaner (1894–1945), Puerto Rican baseball player
- Julio Montaner (born 1956), Argentinean-Canadian physician, professor and researcher
- Luis Montaner, American medical researcher
- Martha Montaner (1955–2016), Uruguayan politician
- Ricardo Montaner (born 1957), Venezuelan singer-songwriter
- Rita Montaner (1900–1958), Cuban singer, pianist and actress
- Vinci Montaner (born 1976), Filipino singer with the band Parokya ni Edgar

== Music ==
- Ricardo Montaner (album), 1987

== See also ==
- Schism of Montaner, 1967–1969, in Montaner, Italy
- Lluís Domènech i Montaner (1850–1923), Spanish Catalan architect
  - Lluís Domènech i Montaner House-Museum
- Château de Montaner, a castle in the commune of Montaner
- Estadio Francisco Montaner, a multi-use stadium in Ponce, Puerto Rico
