= Zavřel =

Zavřel (feminine: Zavřelová) is a Czech surname. Notable people with the surname include:

- Jan Zavřel (1879–1946), Czech zoologist
- Jiří Zavřel (1910–1987), Czech rower
- Štěpán Zavřel (1932–1999), Czech artist and writer
