= Renato Talamini =

Italian epidemiologist

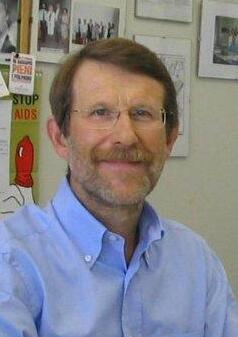
- Renato Talamini, in 2013.
- Born: 19 November 1948 (age 77); Vittorio Veneto, Treviso, Italy
- Scientific career
- Fields: Epidemiology

Renato Talamini (born 19 November 1948) is an Italian Epidemiologist. He is known for his research on cancer etiology, to which he contributed by helping to define the role of tobacco, diet, viral infections, and other lifestyle factors in cancer development. He studied biology at the University of Padua, graduating in 1976, and began working on breast cancer clinical trials the following year.

== Biography ==
Renato Talamini was born in Vittorio Veneto, Italy, into a locally well-known family of bakers. He studied biology at the University of Padua, where he graduated in 1976. In 1977, he joined the Oncology Division of the General Hospital in Pordenone (Italy), where he started working on breast cancer clinical trials. In those years, he was introduced to cancer etiology, starting his first investigation of breast and prostate cancer risk factors.

From 1983 to 1984, he attended the Mario Negri Institute in Milan as a visiting scientist. Here he met Drs Silvia Franceschi and Carlo La Vecchia with whom he laid the foundations of a long-lasting scientific collaboration and friendship.

In 1984, he moved to the National Cancer Institute Centro di Riferimento Oncologico in Aviano (Italy) – officially established the same year – to set up the Unit of Epidemiology and Biostatistics.

In 1988, he earned his post graduate Degree in Epidemiology and Medical statistics at the University of Pavia, (Italy). Between 1998 and 2011 he directed the subunit of Clinical Epidemiology of the Centro di Riferimento Oncologico.

Since the beginning of his scientific activity, Renato Talamini has been involved in the conduction of epidemiological studies to elucidate cancer etiology, with a focus on lifestyle factors.

Besides being well known for his studies on the role tobacco smoking and alcohol abuse in cancer risk, Renato Talamini also devoted a relevant part of his scientific activity to dietary habits and to the study of the role of Hepatitis B and C viruses in the etiology of non-Hodgkin lymphoma and liver cancer.

He is appreciated for his pragmatic approach to scientific investigation. During his working years he has collaborated to several international studies, including ARCAGE studies coordinated by the International Agency for Research on Cancer.

His academic activities include collaborations as appointed Lecturer and Teacher with several Italian Universities among which the Universities of Catania, Udine, and Padua. Renato Talamini is also an appreciated divulger of science; he has been active in educational programs for the youth (in schools) and for the general population.

== See also ==
- Tommaso A. Dragani
