= Artem Kontsevoy (footballer, born 1999) =

Belarusian footballer

Artyom Kontsevoy
Personal information
- Full name: Artyom Aleksandrovich Kontsevoy
- Date of birth: 26 August 1999 (age 27)
- Place of birth: Mogilev, Belarus
- Height: 1.82 m (6 ft 0 in)
- Position: Midfielder

Team information
- Current team: Maxline Vitebsk
- Number: 80

Youth career
- 2016–2017: Dnepr Mogilev

Senior career*
Years	Team	Apps	(Gls)
2017–2018	Dnepr Mogilev	21	(4)
2019	Dnyapro Mogilev	5	(0)
2019	→ Mezőkövesd (loan)	0	(0)
2020–2021	Rukh Brest	54	(12)
2022	Baník Ostrava	7	(0)
2022	Dinamo Minsk	17	(3)
2023	BATE Borisov	24	(4)
2024	Ural Yekaterinburg	4	(0)
2024–2026	Rodina Moscow	19	(2)
2026–	Maxline Vitebsk	14	(5)

International career^{‡}
2018–2020	Belarus U21	7	(0)
2021–	Belarus	20	(6)
- * Club domestic league appearances and goals as of 4 July 2026 ‡ National team caps and goals as of 12 November 2026

Artyom Aleksandrovich Kontsevoy (Belarusian: Арцём Аляксандравіч Канцавы; Russian: Артём Александрович Концевой; born 26 August 1999) is a Belarusian professional footballer who plays as a midfielder for Belarusian Premier League club Maxline Vitebsk and the Belarus national team. He has also appeared for the Belarus U21 team.

== Club career ==
On 26 January 2024, Kontsevoy signed with Russian Premier League club Ural Yekaterinburg.

== International career ==
He made his debut for the Belarus national football team on 2 September 2021 in a World Cup qualifier against the Czech Republic, a 0–1 away loss. He substituted Max Ebong in the 89th minute.

== Career statistics ==
=== Club ===
As of match played 1 June 2024

Appearances and goals by club, season and competition
Club	Season	League			National cup		Europe		Other		Total	
Club	Season	Division	Apps	Goals	Apps	Goals	Apps	Goals	Apps	Goals	Apps	Goals
Dnepr Mogilev	2017	Belarusian Premier League	2	0	0	0	—		—		2	0
Dnepr Mogilev	2018	Belarusian Premier League	19	4	2	0	—		—		21	4
Dnepr Mogilev	Total		21	4	2	0	—		—		23	4
Dnyapro Mogilev	2019	Belarusian Premier League	5	0	1	0	—		—		6	0
Mezőkövesd (loan)	2019–20	Nemzeti Bajnokság I	0	0	3	0	—		—		3	0
Rukh Brest	2020	Belarusian Premier League	25	5	1	0	—		—		26	5
Rukh Brest	2021	Belarusian Premier League	29	7	2	0	—		—		31	7
Rukh Brest	Total		54	12	3	0	—		—		57	12
Baník Ostrava	2021–22	Czech First League	7	0	—		—		—		7	0
Dinamo Minsk	2022	Belarusian Premier League	17	3	1	0	2 (Note: Appearances in UEFA Europa Conference League)	1	—		20	4
BATE Borisov	2023	Belarusian Premier League	24	4	6	2	8 (Note: Appearances in UEFA Champions League, UEFA Europa League, and UEFA Europa Conference League)	3	—		38	9
Ural	2023–24	Russian Premier League	4	0	1	0	—		1 (Note: Appearance in the relegation play-offs)	0	6	0
Career total			132	23	17	2	10	4	1	0	160	29

=== International ===
As of match played 12 November 2026

Appearances and goals by national team and year
National team	Year	Apps	Goals
Belarus	2021	3	1
Belarus	2022	0	0
Belarus	2023	6	0
Belarus	2024	3	0
Belarus	2025	2	1
Belarus	2026	6	4
Total		20	6

Scores and results list Belarus' goal tally first.

No	Date	Venue	Opponent	Score	Result	Competition
1.	13 November 2021	Cardiff City Stadium, Cardiff, Wales	Wales	1–4	1–5	2022 FIFA World Cup qualification
2.	20 March 2025	Pamir Stadium, Dushanbe, Tajikistan	Tajikistan	5–0	5–0	Friendly
3.	5 June 2026	National Football Stadium, Minsk, Belarus	Syria	2–0	4–1	Friendly
4.	3 October 2026	Illovszky Rudolf Stadion, Budapest, Hungary	San Marino	1–0	4–0	2026–27 UEFA Nations League C
5.	3 October 2026	Illovszky Rudolf Stadion, Budapest, Hungary	San Marino	4–0	4–0	2026–27 UEFA Nations League C
6.	12 November 2026	San Marino Stadium, Serravalle, San Marino	San Marino	2–0	2–0	2026–27 UEFA Nations League C
