= Vittorio Veneto =

- Comune
- Città di Vittorio Veneto
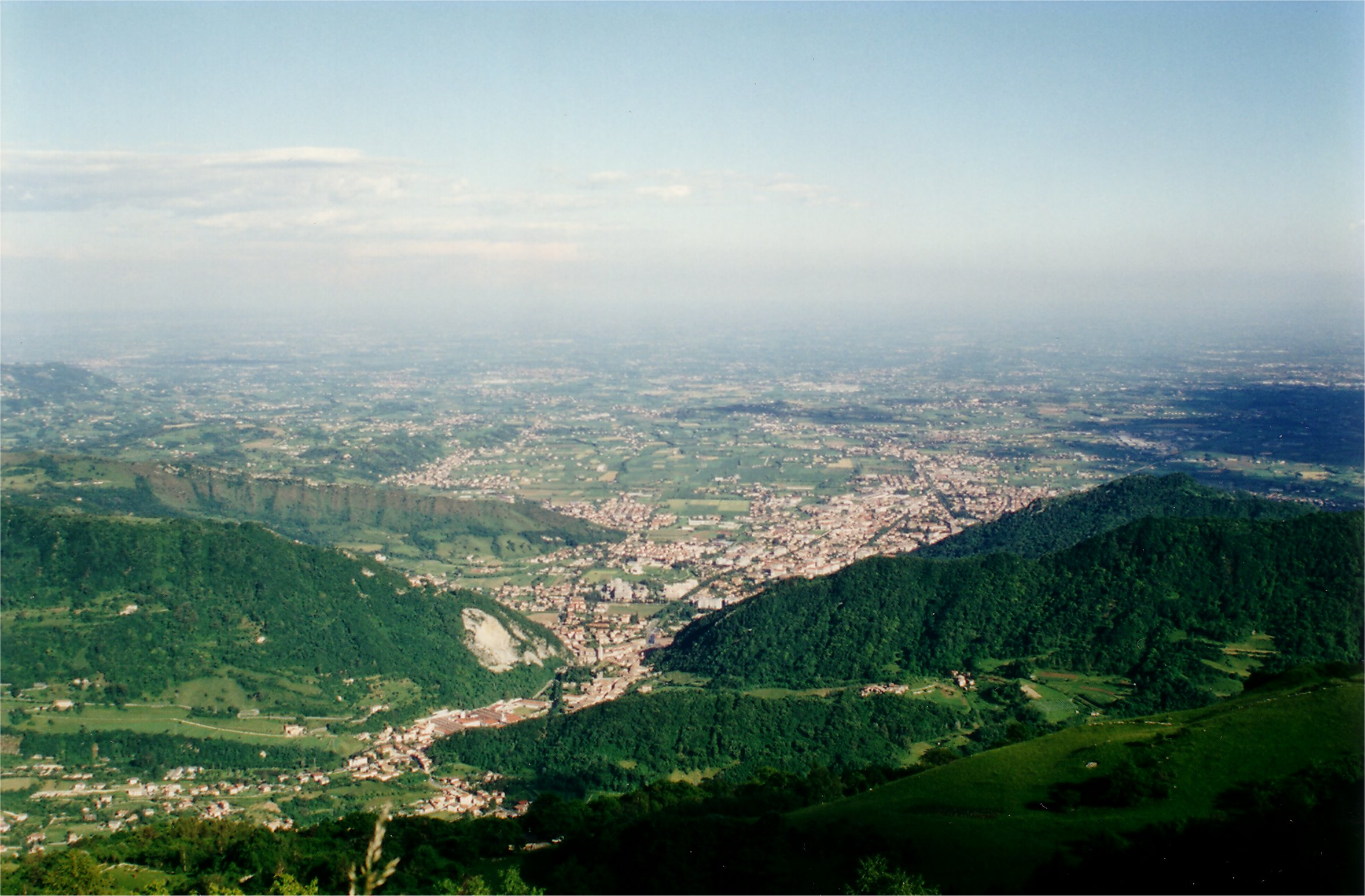

- Flag Coat of arms

- Location within Italy Location within Veneto
- Coordinates: 45°59′N 12°18′E
- Country: Italy
- Region: Veneto
- Province: Treviso (TV)
- Frazioni: Carpesica, Confin, Cozzuolo, Fadalto, Formeniga, Longhere, Nove, San Lorenzo, San Giacomo di Veglia

Government
  - Mayor: Mirella Balliana

Area
  - Total: 82 km^{2} (32 sq mi)
- Elevation: 138 m (453 ft)

Population (30 October 2025)
  - Total: 27,245
  - Density: 330/km^{2} (860/sq mi)
- Demonym: Vittoriesi
- Time zone: UTC+1 (CET)
  - Summer (DST): UTC+2 (CEST)
- Postal code: 31029
- Dialing code: 0438
- Patron saint: St. Titian and Augusta of Treviso
- Saint day: January 16, August 22
- Website: Official website

Vittorio Veneto is a city and comune situated in the Province of Treviso, in the region of Veneto, Italy, in the northeast of Italy, between the Piave and the Livenza rivers, borders with the following municipalities:

Alpago (BL), Belluno (BL), Cappella Maggiore, Colle Umberto, Conegliano, Fregona, Limana (BL), Revine Lago, San Pietro di Feletto, Tarzo.

== Origins of the name ==
The city is an amalgamation of two former comuni, Cèneda and Serravalle, which were joined into one municipality in 1866 and named Vittorio after the King of Italy, Vittorio Emanuele II. The battle fought nearby in November 1918 became generally known as the Battle of Vittorio Veneto, and the city's name was officially changed to Vittorio Veneto in July 1923. Starting from the end of the nineteenth century, new neighborhoods were created around the road that connected the two towns, the current Viale della Vittoria, so that the union was also physical, and the town hall itself was placed halfway. However, the city still continues to demonstrate a certain bipolarity, and in fact Ceneda and Serravalle, despite their proximity, have very distinct historical identities.

== Geography ==
The Meschio River, whose source is located in the Lapisina Valley, a few miles north of the city, passes down through the town from Serravalle through the district that bears its name. The north of Vittorio Veneto is straddled by mountains including the majestic Col Visentin. To the east is the state park and forest of Cansiglio which summits at Monte Pizzoc; to the west, a hill region including Valdobbiadene, where Prosecco wine is produced; and to the south is the commercial town of Conegliano.

=== Administrative subdivisions ===
According to the communal statute, the commune does not recognize any fraction within itself. There are numerous distinct areas and local autonomy is guaranteed to the following seven districts (Followed by the main settlements that are part of it).

- 1 - Val Lapisina: Fadalto, Nove, San Floriano, Savassa, Forcal, Longhere, Maren, Fais.
- 2 - Serravalle: Sant'Andrea, San Lorenzo, Serravalle
- 3 - Center: Centro, Salsa, Martin
- 4 - Costa-Meschio: Costa, Meschio
- 5 - Ceneda: Alta and Ceneda Bassa (Saints Peter and Paul)
- 6 - San Giacomo: San Giacomo di Veglia
- 7 - Val dei Fiori: Carpesica, Cozzuolo, Formeniga

== History ==
=== Ancient period ===
The area was occupied in ancient times by Veneti and perhaps Celts. A pagan sanctuary was in use on Monte Altare by Veneti, Celts, and Romans.

During the 1st century BC Emperor Augustus established a Castrum Cenetense at the foot of an important pass northward towards Bellunum in what is now the heart of Serravalle to defend Opitergium and the Venetian plain to the south. To the immediate south of the castrum there developed a settlement called a vicus in what is now Ceneda and Meschio. While its precise course has not been determined, the Via Claudia Altinate running north from the Via Postumia seems to have passed the Roman castrum and vicus on its eastern side. Meanwhile, there remains evidence of typical Roman land surveying (centuratio) with cardines being associated with the present day Via Rizzera and Via Cal Alta (in the commune of Cappella Maggiore) and a decumanus identified with the Va Cal de Livera. This implies Ceneta became more than a mere vicus during the Roman period.

=== Late antiquity ===
The ancient Pieve di Sant'Andrea in Bigonzo in the northeast of the town, on the southern end of Serravalle, attests to the presence of Christianity in the area by the 4th century.

In the early 5th century, Emperor Honorius seems to have named a certain Marcellus count (comes) of Ceneta. Ceneta and Serravalle were among the places in Venetia devastated by Attila the Hun, but later refortified under the rule of Theodoric, king of the Ostrogoths.

Byzantine writer, Agathias Scholasticus, as well as the Latin poet, Venantius Fortunatus, from nearby Valdobbiadene, are witnesses to the existence of the town of Ceneta in the 6th century. Agathias recounts how during Justinian's Gothic War, Ceneda changed hands between the Ostrogoths, Franks, and Byzantines. In fact, after the Byzantines had seized Venetia from the Ostrogoths, they turned their attention to conquering central and southern Italy. In the spring of 553, while Narses was engaging the Ostrogoths, the Franks led by the brothers Leutari and Buccelin took a large part of Venetia and sought refuge in Ceneta, holding it sometime in the spring of 554.

In 568, the Lombards invaded Italy and Ceneda was irrevocably captured from the Byzantines. Lombard social and military colonies called fara seem to have been established at Farra d'Alpago to the north of Ceneda and at Farra di Soligo to the west. It was perhaps at this time or perhaps still later that Ceneda was made into the seat of one of 36 Lombard duchies. The Lombards constructed a castle, now called castello di San Martino near the heart of Ceneda on a strategic mountain which overlooks the town. By 667, the Duchy of Ceneda was certainly in existence and grew in size when, according to Paul the Deacon it acquired some of the territory of Oderzo after that city's destruction by the Lombards.

In 685, the Lombard King Grimoald I organized Ceneda into an ecclesiastical diocese, assigning to it a large part of the territory that had been under the care of the suppressed diocese of Oderzo. The diocese of Ceneda was within the metropolitan jurisdiction of the Patriarchate of Aquileia. At the foot of the same height upon which the duke's castle had been built, a cathedral was constructed. St. Titian, Bishop of Oderzo, whose relics are contained in the present cathedral, was named as co-patron of the diocese along with St. Augusta, a virgin martyr from Serravalle.

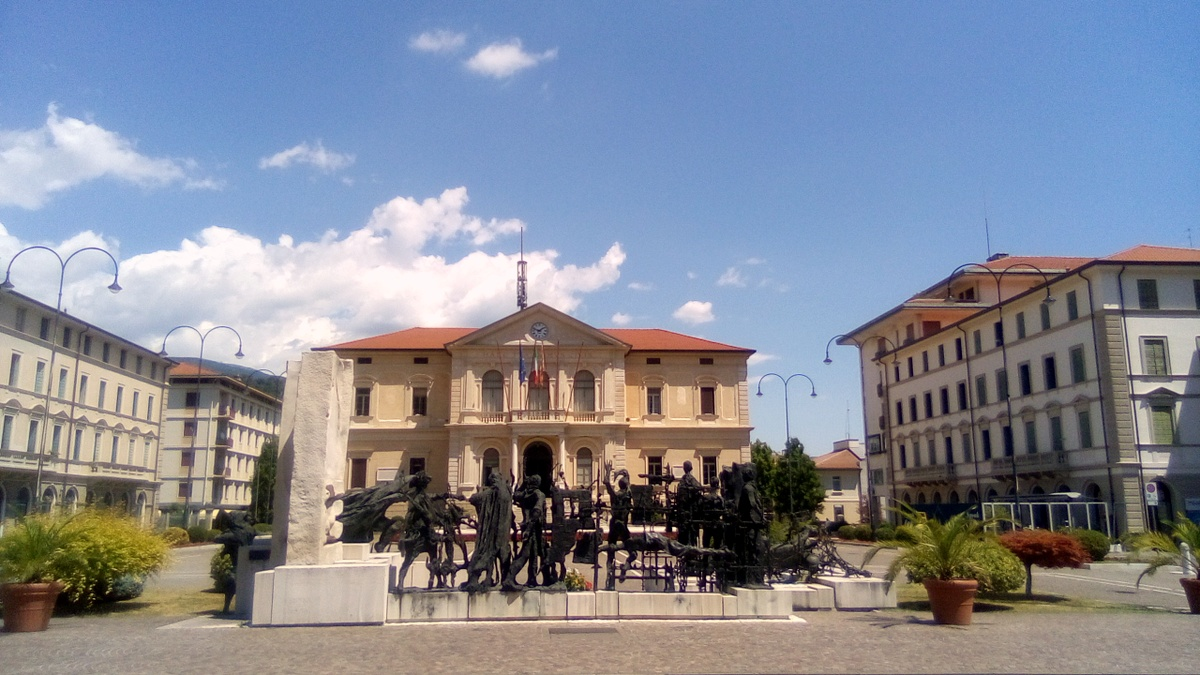
City hall

=== Carolingian period ===
With the defeat of the Lombards in 774, Ceneda entered into the Frankish sphere. It seems the duke of Ceneda remained loyal to Charlemagne even when the Lombard dukes of Cividale, Treviso, and Vicenza rebelled the following year.

=== Middle Ages ===
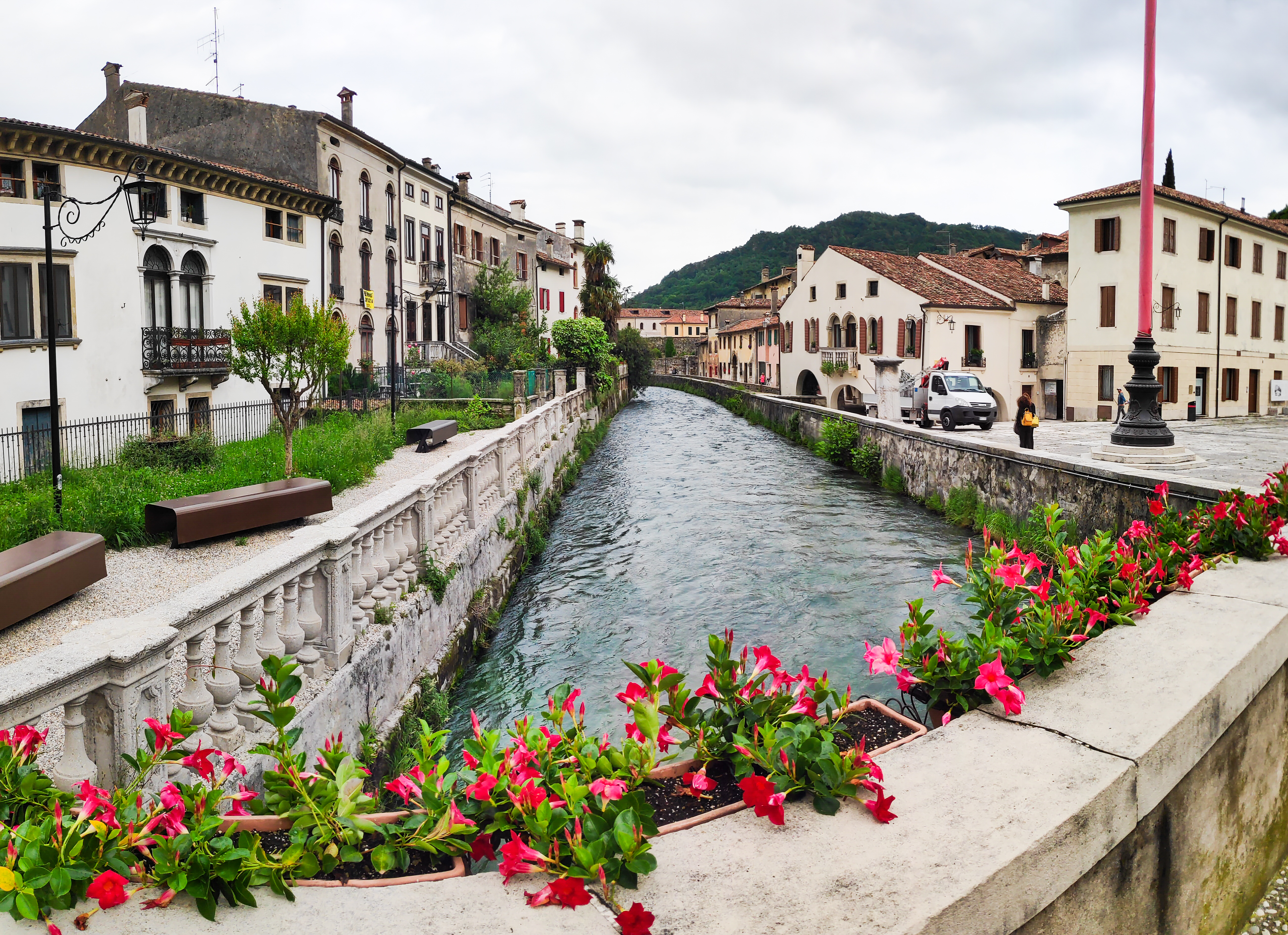
Serravalle

In 994, the Holy Roman Emperor Otto III invested the bishop of Ceneda with the title and prerogatives of count and authority as temporal lord of the city. The 12th, 13th, and part of the 14th centuries were turbulent for Ceneda and Serravalle. During this time, the bishop of Ceneda was forced into the role of count, and thus, to take part in the politics of Northern Italy and even joining the Lombard League against the Holy Roman Empire. Ceneda also faced threats from its neighbors and in 1147 was attacked by the commune of Treviso. Only the mediation of the pope led to the restitution of what had been stolen, including the relics of St. Titian. In 1174, Serravalle became a fief of the Da Camino family. Ceneda and Serravalle would subsequently be contested by the da Romano family and the Patriarchs of Aquileia. In 1328, the area fell into the hands of the Scaligeri.

In 1307, Bishop Francesco Ramponi ceded the territory of Portobuffolé to Tolberto da Camino in exchange for county of Tarzo (also called Castelnuovo) which included Corbanese, Arfanta, Colmaor and Fratta. In Fratta, authority was invested in a vice-count of the bishop.

=== Venetian period ===
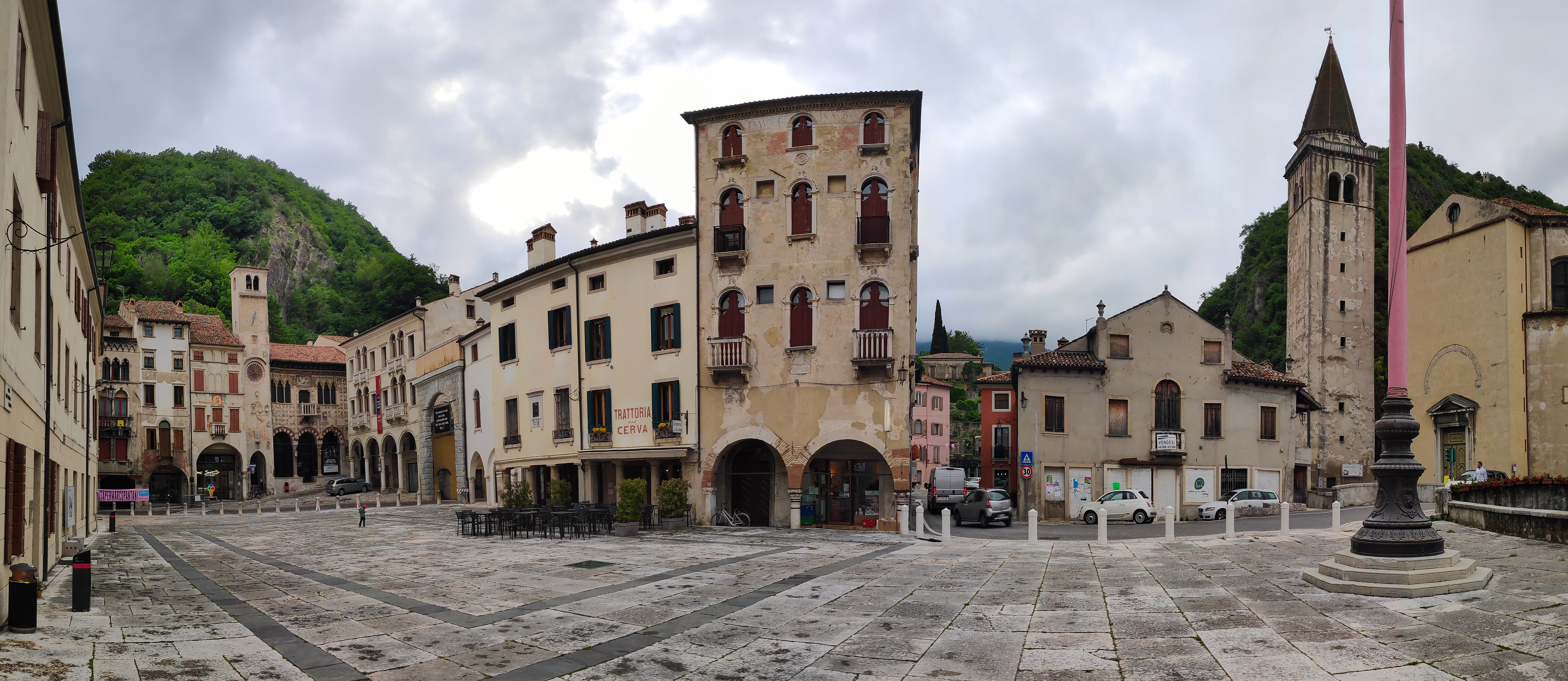
Serravalle middle ages square

On December 19, 1389, Ceneda was peacefully incorporated into the Venetian Republic. Its bishops still retained authority as counts. However, in 1447 and in 1514 bishops Francesco and Oliviero, respectively, ceded to the Republic the right of civil investiture within the territory of Ceneda, reserving for themselves and their successors authority over the commune itself and a few villas. The privileges of Ceneda's bishops as counts were definitively revoked by the Republic in 1768.

Under Venetian rule, the urban development of Ceneda remained concentrated around the cathedral while the rest of the commune remained primarily agricultural with homes either scattered far and wide or sometimes organized in tiny clusters. Serravalle, however, which had come under Venetian rule in 1337 rose to its greatest splendor under the Serenissima, even eclipsing Ceneda in economic and urban development.

In 1411, a Hungarian army led by Pippo Spano attacked Ceneda and destroyed the episcopal archives. Both Ceneda and Serravalle suffered during the War of Cambrai.

A significant Jewish community grew in Ceneda throughout the Venetian period. Lorenzo Da Ponte, a librettist to Mozart, was a Jewish native of Ceneda, who took the bishop of Ceneda's name when he was baptized a Roman Catholic.

=== Napoleonic era ===
In March 1797, the French army of Massena entered the towns putting an end to Venetian rule. By the Treaty of Campoformio, the area passed to the rule of the Holy Roman Empire. From 1805 until 1814 Ceneda and Serravalle were incorporated into Napoleon's Kingdom of Italy.

=== Austrian period ===
After the Fall of Napoleon, the area was given with the rest of Venetia to the Austrian Empire.

=== Italian period ===
On November 22, 1866, soon after the Veneto was annexed by the Kingdom of Italy, Ceneda and Serravalle were joined into one municipality named after the King of Italy, Vittorio Emanuele.

During the First World War, Vittorio was occupied by Austro-Hungarian forces. In October 1918, Vittorio was the site of the last battle between Italy and Austria-Hungary during World War I. It led to the victory of Italy over the Austro-Hungarian Empire (Austrian-Italian Armistice of Villa Giusti) effective on 4 November 1918.

The word "Veneto", was attached to the city's name in 1923. Subsequently, many streets in other parts of Italy have been named Via Vittorio Veneto.

The Italian victory at the Battle of Vittorio Veneto led to the town lending its name as a military honor. Thus, in the 1930s, a battleship was named Vittorio Veneto. In the 1960s, a flight deck cruiser, the flagship of the Italian Navy, was given the same name. In 1968, a military medal called the Order of Vittorio Veneto (Ordine di Vittorio Veneto) was awarded to Italian veterans who had participated honorably for at least six months during the First World War.

== Civil Administration (Mayors) during the Italian Republic ==
- Giovanni Poldemengo (1946-1951) Italian Communist Party
- Vittorio Della Porta (1951-1956) Christian Democrat Party
- Ferruccio Faggin (1956-1960) Italian Socialist Party
- Enrico Talin (1960-1961) Christian Democrat Party
- Mario Ulliana (1961-1965) Christian Democrat Party
- Aldo Toffoli (1965-1975) Christian Democrat Party
- Giorgio Pizzol (1975-1982) Italian Communist Party
- Franco Concas (1982-1988) Italian Socialist Party
- Mario Botteon (1988-1995) Christian Democrat Party
- Antonio Della Libera (1995-1999) Italian Popular Party
- Giancarlo Scottà (1999-2009) Lega Nord Party
- Gianantonio Da Re (2009-2014) Lega Nord Party
- Roberto Tonon (2014-2019) Democratic Party
- Antonio Miatto (2019-2024) Lega Nord Party
- Mirella Balliana (2024- ) Centre-left civic lists coalition

== Architecture ==
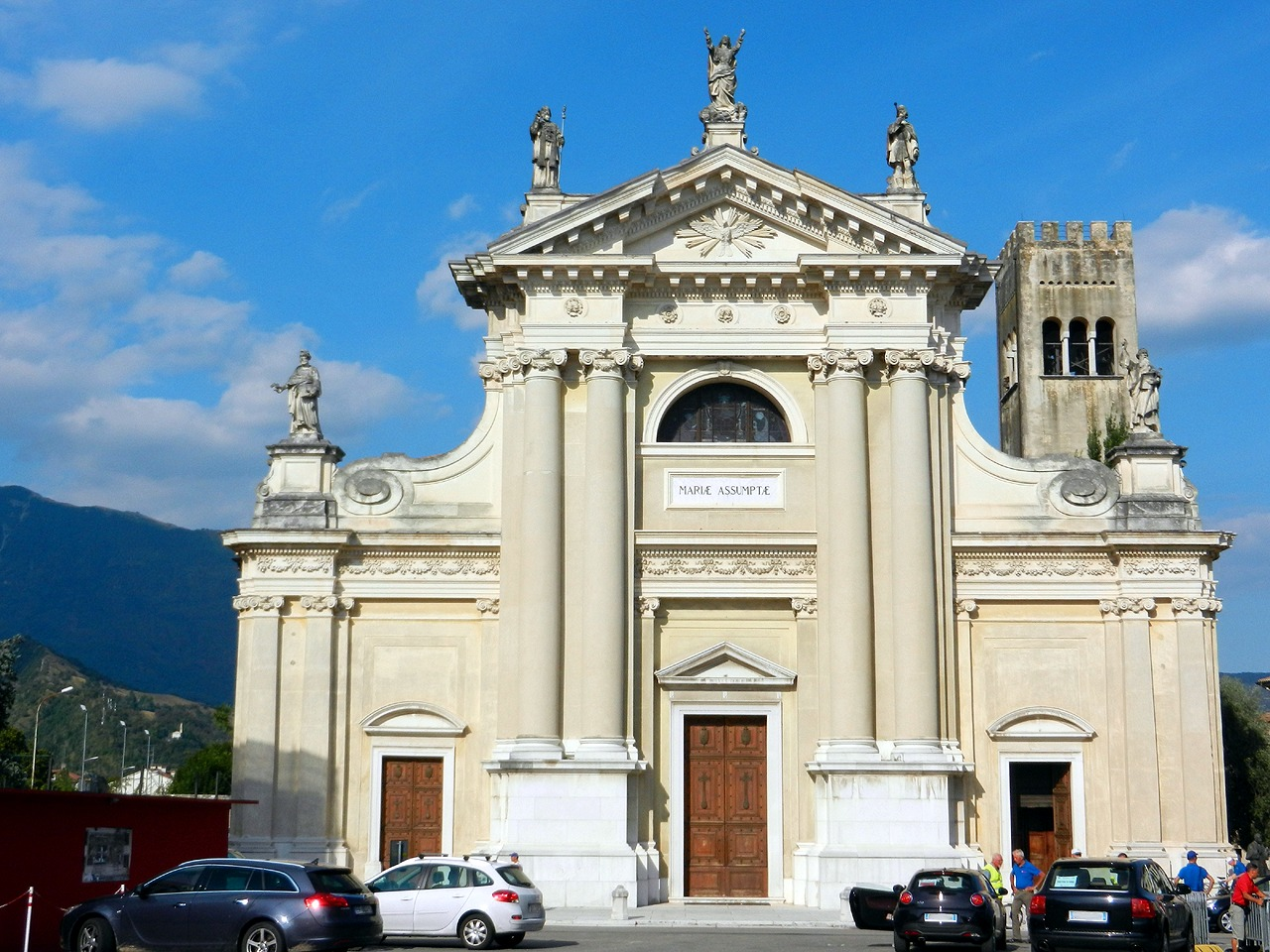
- The Cathedral of St. Mary of the Assumption
  Cathedral of St. Mary of the Assumption (Duomo di Serravalle), rebuilt between 1740 and 1768 on earlier medieval foundations, is one of the main examples of Venetian Baroque in the region. The façade, designed by Giovanni Miazzi, features classical pilasters and a monumental tympanum. The interior preserves works by Francesco Frigimelica il Vecchio, Giovanni De Min, and a notable Last Supper attributed to Pomponio Amalteo, a pupil of Pordenone. The adjacent Campanile, originally a defensive tower of the medieval walls, retains its 12th‑century stone structure.
- Church of Santa Maria dei Battuti, founded in 1314 by the confraternity of the Battuti, the church is a rare example of late Venetian Gothic in the area. The interior houses a cycle of frescoes (15th–16th century) attributed to Girolamo da Treviso and later local masters. The adjoining Hospice of the Battuti, with its long portico, was historically used as a shelter for pilgrims and the poor.
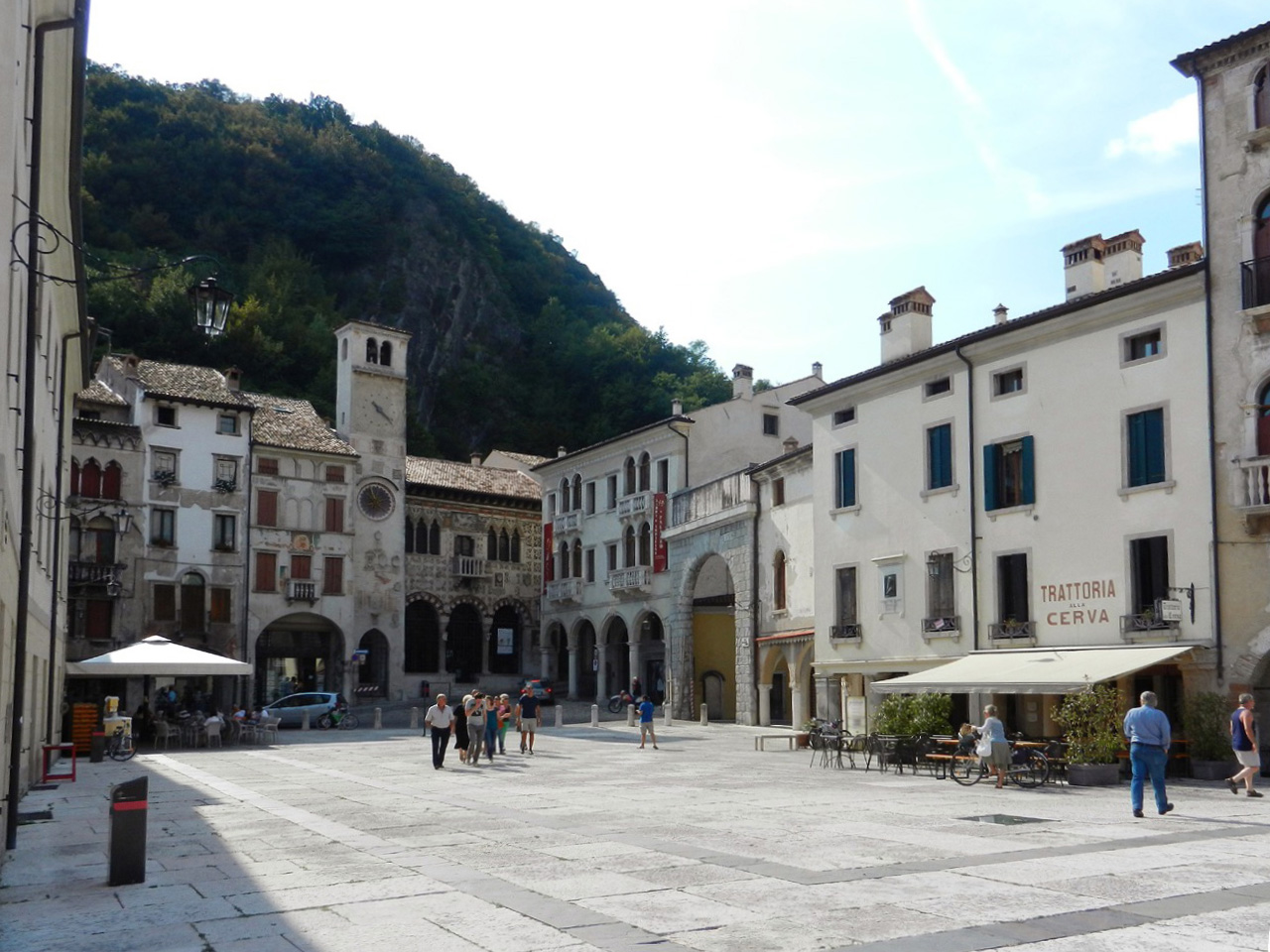
  Piazza Flaminio
- Sanctuary of Santa Augusta, located on the slopes of Mount Marcantone, the sanctuary was rebuilt in 1450 over an earlier medieval chapel dedicated to Saint Augusta, patron saint of Serravalle. The Gothic portal and the 16th‑century bell tower dominate the structure. The interior preserves votive frescoes and ex‑votos documenting centuries of local devotion.
- Piazza Flaminio, the main square of Serravalle is surrounded by Renaissance and Baroque palaces, including Palazzo Minucci‑De Carlo, Palazzo della Comunità, and Palazzo Cesana. Many façades preserve 16th‑century fresco decorations, a characteristic feature of Vittorio Veneto’s urban landscape. The square was historically the civic and mercantile center of the town.
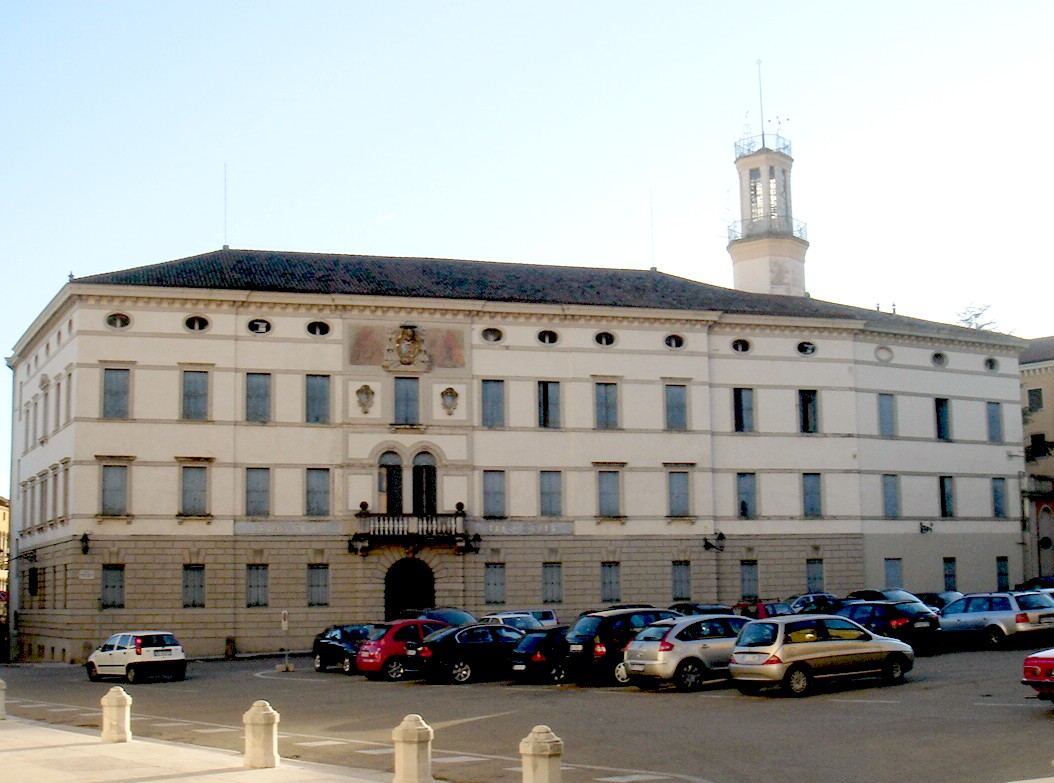
- Episcopal Palace of Ceneda
  Episcopal Palace of Ceneda, originally medieval, the palace was transformed between the 17th and 18th centuries into a grand episcopal residence. The façade combines Venetian Baroque and neoclassical elements. Inside are frescoes by Francesco Zugno, a pupil of Giambattista Tiepolo, and historical archives documenting the diocese’s long history.
- Palazzo Minucci‑De Carlo, A 16th‑century noble residence, later expanded in the 18th century. The palace preserves frescoes, stuccoes, and a rich collection of paintings and historical objects assembled by Camillo De Carlo, a patriot and officer during World War I. Today it houses the Museo della Battaglia, dedicated to the 1918 Battle of Vittorio Veneto.
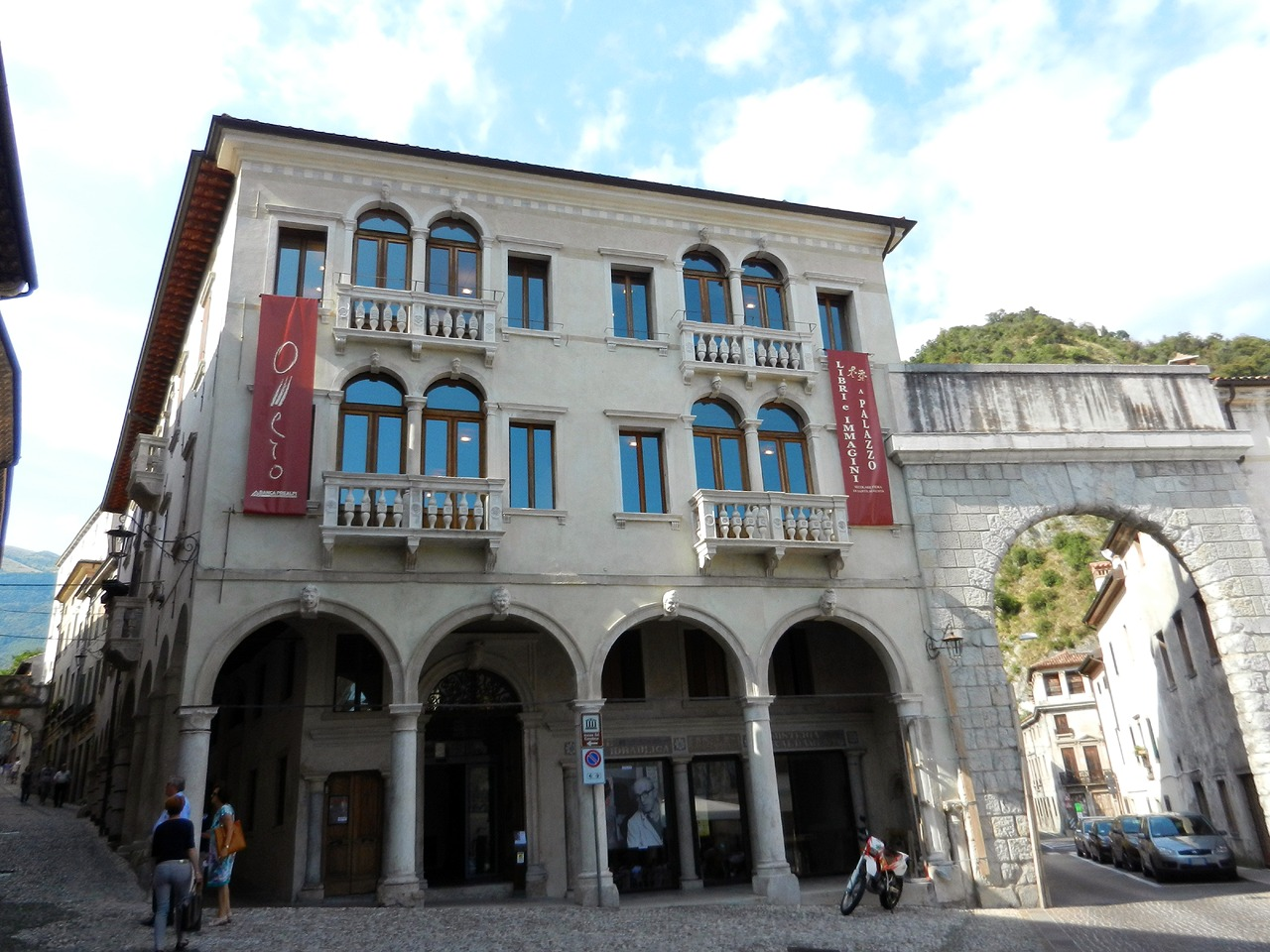
  Palazzo Todesco
- Palazzo Todesco, most notable aristocratic residences of Serravalle. Originally built in the 16th century and later expanded during the 17th and 18th centuries, the palace overlooks Piazza Flaminio and exemplifies the Venetian patrician architecture typical of the Treviso area. The façade features classical stone frames, arched windows and remnants of external fresco decoration once attributed to local Renaissance workshops.

== Economy ==
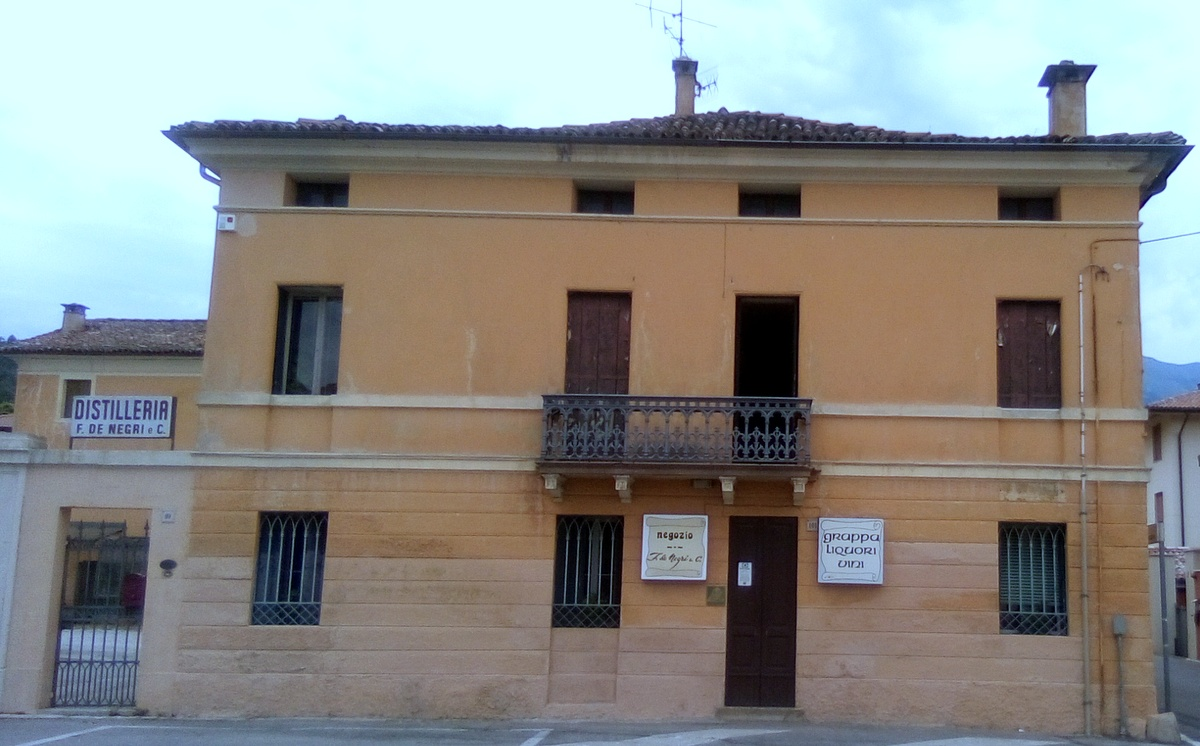
De Negri distillery

The ancient manufacturing, steel and textile factories, which have always characterized it and which for the most part followed the lively course of the Meschio river, have now been replaced by others and more numerous, linked to the different productions required by a global economy. The main activities are located in the industrial area of San Giacomo, one of the major regional industrial centers, not only for the multiplicity of productions, but also for the importance and consolidated quality of companies known nationally and internationally.

The presence of vineyards in the municipal area is remarkable, the Permasteelisa group manufacturing plant and also of the De Negri distillery should be noted.

== Culture ==
=== Education ===
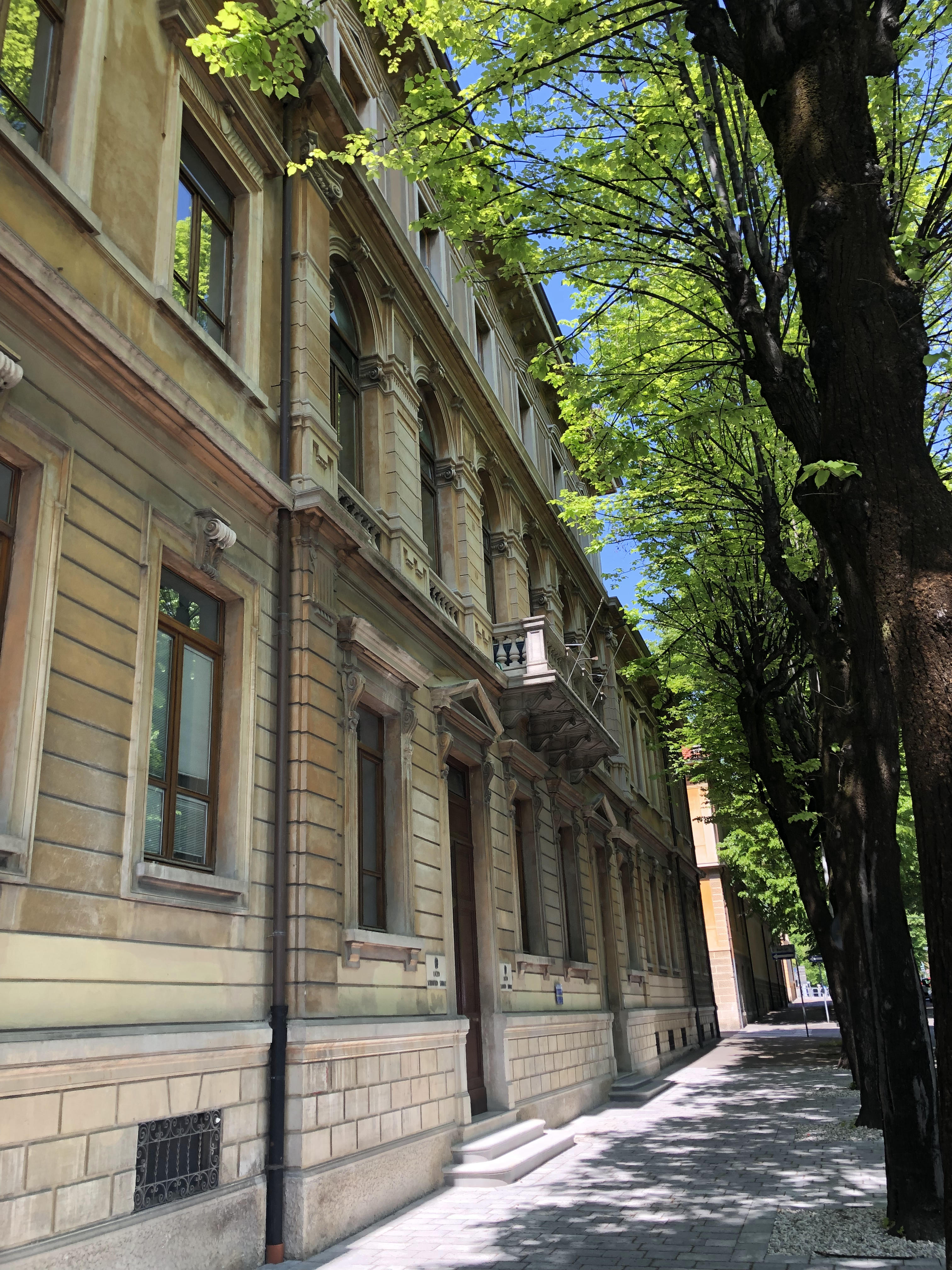
Liceo Flaminio - entrance of central school in via Dante, 6

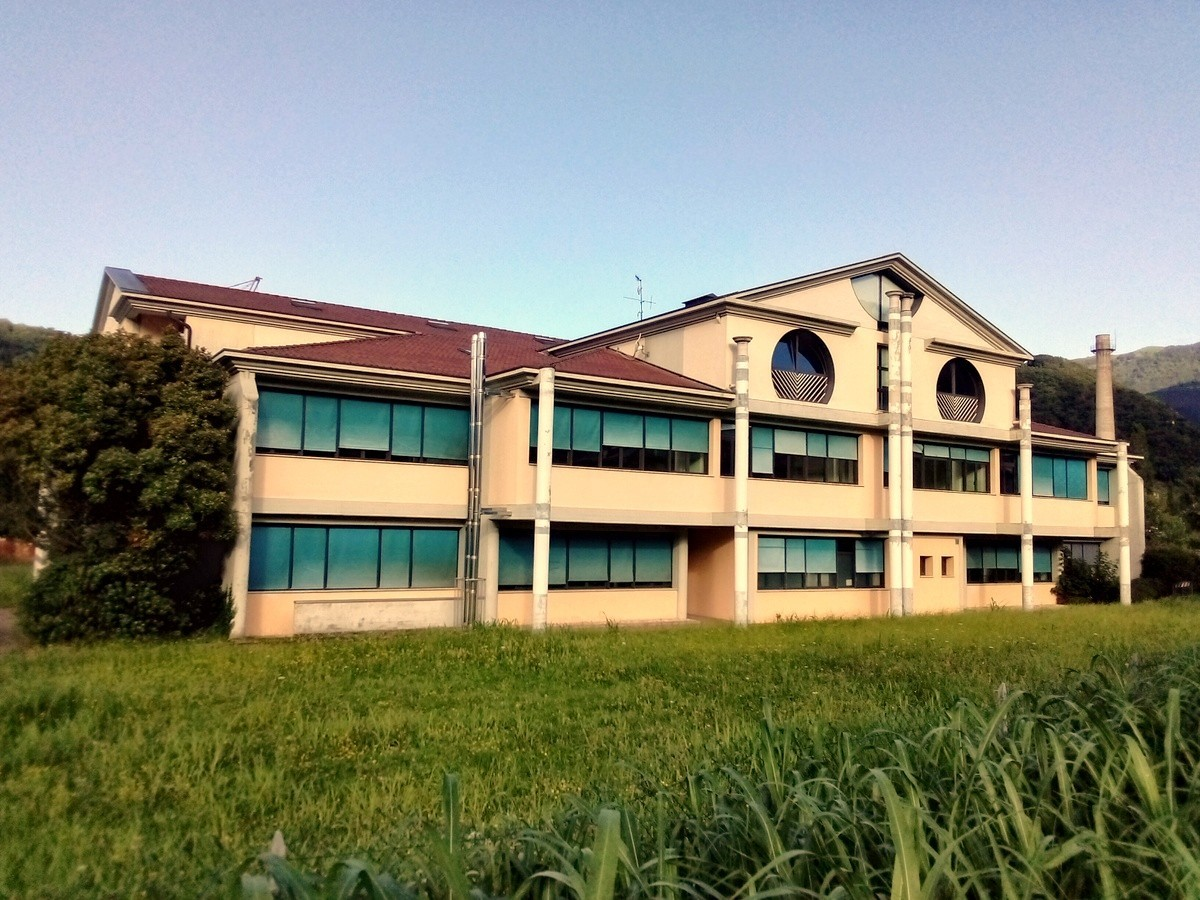
Liceo Flaminio -detached school in via Talin

There are also numerous high schools in the city, most of which are located in the context of the school campus in the city center. Specifically, the high schools in Vittorio Veneto are:

- *Liceo "Marcantonio Flaminio" high school, divided into various addresses: classical high school; scientific high school; scientific high school option applied sciences; high school of human sciences.
- Liceo Artistico Bruno Munari , divided into various addresses: figurative arts; architecture and environment; fashion design; jewelry design; industrial design; graphics; multimedia audiovisual.
- State Professional Institute for Hotel Services and Catering Alfredo Beltrame , divided into various addresses: tourist reception; hall and sales services; kitchen sector; option of artisanal and industrial confectionery products.
- Higher Education Institute City of Victory , established in 2007 by incorporating within it the Professional Institute for Industry and Crafts, the Economic Technical Institute and the Technical Technical Institute. The Province of Treviso plans the new IIS "City of Victory" in Vittorio Veneto which should see the construction site open by the end of 2022 after the demolition of the Institute's current headquarters.

In the city, in the historic center of Serravalle, there is also the Dante International College, with the addresses of scientific high school sports and high school scientific digital business creativity.

=== Cultural institutions ===
- Pieve di Sant'Andrea
- Duomo di Serravalle
- Teatro Lorenzo da Ponte

Every year, the Concorso Nazionale Corale "Trofei Città di Vittorio Veneto" takes place at Vittorio Veneto. The best choirs from all over Italy compete. The city is also host to a violin competition.

- Palace Todesco: the building owned by Giuseppe Todesco was bequeathed in 1961 to the Municipality of Vittorio Veneto and is intended for prestigious exhibitions and art exhibitions, as well as any other initiative of cultural, social, touristic value.

=== Media ===
Radio Palazzo Carli is a community radio managed by a non-profit organization. The RPC Association is not for profit and is proposed as a religious, social and educational sound broadcasting service through the transmission of various self-produced or acquired programs from third parties. There are two detached studios: in Vittorio Veneto and in Conegliano. The connection with the Vittorio Veneto Cathedral and the one with the inBlu circuit from Rome is also functioning. The reception frequency for the Vittoriese is FM 103.90 MHz and on the Veneto Dab mux-channel 8D (201.072 MHz).

== Infrastructure and transport ==
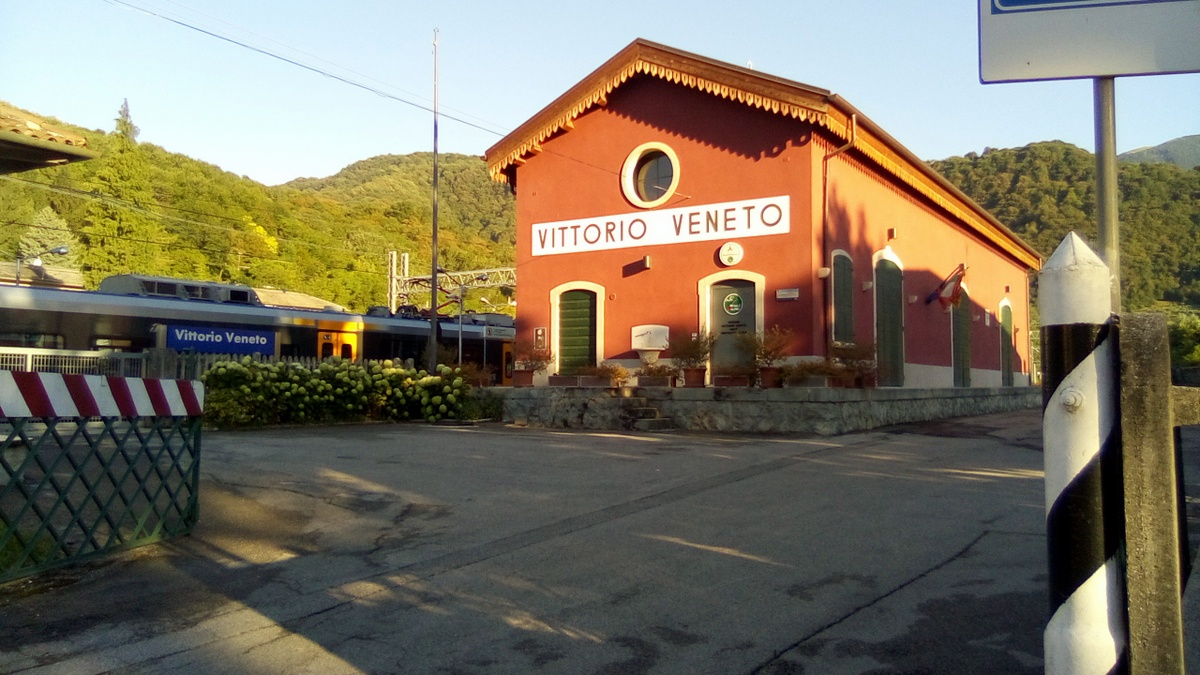
Vittorio Veneto station

=== Railways ===
The city of Vittorio Veneto has two railway stations served by the Ponte nelle Alpi-Conegliano line, fully electrified since February 2021: the Vittorio Veneto station, located in the city center and the Soffratta stop, located in the Ceneda district, serving the center historical district and the southern area of the city.

On the Conegliano-Ponte nelle Alpi line interventions from September 14 to December 13, 2025, work will be done in Vittorio Veneto with a new underpass and trackwork. Waterproofing work in the tunnel, maintenance of embankments and walls, and the installation of an advanced safety system at the "Ai Gai" level crossing are planned.

== Language ==
Form ("to be")	Cenedese	Venetian	Latin
Infinitive	èsar	èser	esse
1st Person Sing.	mi són	mi só(n)	ego sum
2nd Person Sing.	ti te sé	ti ti si	tu es
3rd Person Sing.	lu 'l é	lu xè	ille est
1st Person Plur.	noiàltri sén	nu sémo	nos sumus
2nd Person Plur.	voiàltri sé	vu sé	vos estis
3rd Person Plur.	lori i é	lori xè	illi sunt

The local Venetian dialect, called "Cenedese," or since the fusion of Ceneda and Serravalle, "Vittoriese," pertains more to the northern variant of Venetian, such as the dialect of Belluno, but it also shares features with the central variant of Treviso due to the influence of Venice.

Characteristics of Cenedese distinguishing it from Venetian include the frequent dropping of final "-o", for example, Venetian "gòto" ("cup") is gòt in Cenedese. When this occurs leaving a final "-m", the "-m" is further nasalized to an "-n". Thus, for example, Venetian "sémo" ("we are") is "sén" in Cenedese.

Another rustic feature of Cenedese is that the first person singular of indicative verbs usually ends in "-e" rather than in "-o." Thus, Cenedese "mi magne" is equivalent to Venetian "mi magno" ("I eat"), "mi vede" ("I see") is "mi vedo," and "mi dorme" ("I sleep") is "mi dormo.

A northern feature of Cenedese, shared with Bellunese, is its refusal to attach "ghe" onto the verb "avér" ("to have") as is done in the dialects of Venice, Padua, and Treviso. Thus, where Venetian says "mi gò" ("I have") or "ti ti gà" ("you (sing.) have"), Cenedese says "mi ò" and "ti te à," respectively.

One can often find the past participle of second conjugation verbs ending in "-ést" in Cenedese, rather than "-u" as in modern Venetian, for example, "vegnést" ("came"), "bevést" ("drunken"), "vedést" ("seen"), etc.

Native poet Aldo Toffoli describes a sibilant unique to Ceneda as "un suono derivante dallo schiacciamento di una sibilante dentale (alveolare) sorda (s = italiano "sera") su una affricata dentale sorda (ts = italiano "zucchero"), con un fortissimo assottigliamento del suono finale." He uses a simple z to indicate the sound, although suggests it is better represented by sts. Examples are "mezo" ("half"), "pianze" ("weeps"), "ruzene" ("rust"), "zimitero" ("cemetery"), etc. Notably, in some more northern and rural areas of the Veneto, this sound is voiced as a theta.

Overall, Cenedese remains intelligible to speakers of other dialects of the Venetian language.

== People ==
- Albino Luciani (Pope John Paul I) – bishop of Vittorio Veneto from 1958 to 1969.
- Lorenzo Da Ponte – opera librettist for Wolfgang Amadeus Mozart.
- Marcantonio Flaminio (born 1498) – Renaissance humanist.
- Paolo Barison (born 1936) – football player.
- Emanuela Da Ros (born 1959) – children's books writer.
- Francesca Segat (born 1983) – Italian butterfly swimmer.
- Gabriele Pin (born 1962) – football player and coach.
- Andrea Poli (born 1989) – football player.
- Tommaso Benvenuti (rugby union) (born 1990) – rugby union player.
- Renato Talamini – Italian epidemiologist.
- Bartolomeo Costantini – racing driver.

== See also ==
- Battle of Vittorio Veneto
- Order of Vittorio Veneto
- Vittorio Veneto-class battleship
- Cruiser Vittorio Veneto

== Twin towns ==
- São Caetano do Sul, Brazil, since 1984
- Finale Ligure, Italy, since 1998
- Criciúma, Brazil, since 2000

== Bibliography ==
=== In Italian ===
- Basilio Sartori (2005). A Ceneda con S. Tiziano vescovo e i suoi successori (712-2005). Vittorio Veneto: TIPSE.
