= Montaner (Italy) =

Frazione in province of Treviso, Italy

- Frazione
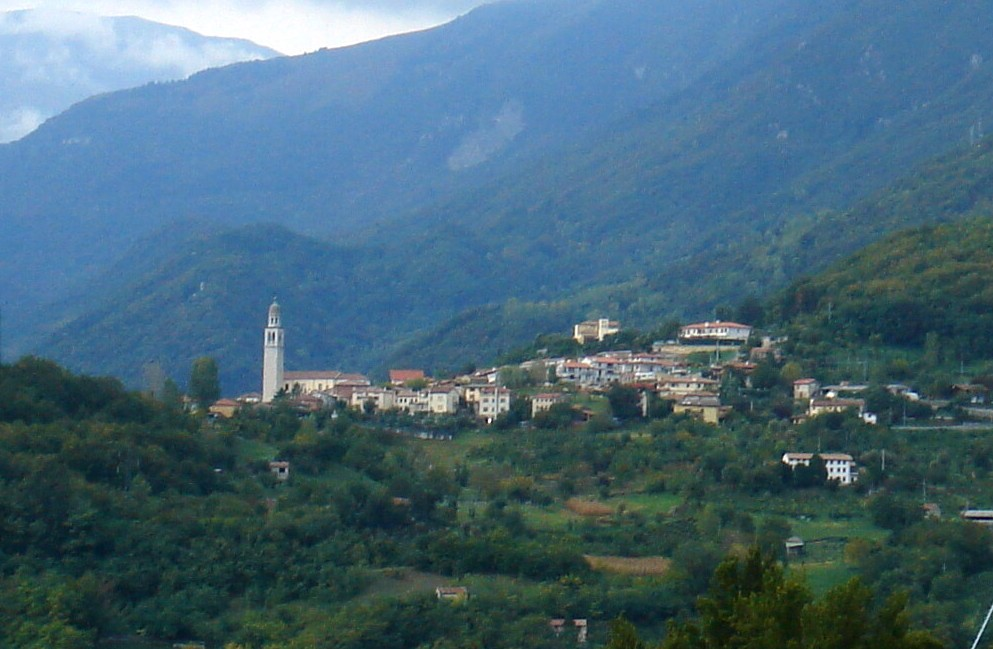
- Panorama of Montaner
- Interactive map of Montaner
- Coordinates: 45.99822°N 12.37866°E
- Comune: Sarmede
- Provinces of Italy: Province of Treviso

Population
  - Total: 922
- Postal code: 31026

Montaner is a frazione in Italy located in the commune of Sarmede, Province of Treviso. The village is notable for being the location of the Schism of Montaner, following the dispute over the appointment of a local priest. The last Italian census in 2011 recorded the population as 922, the population estimate by the Italian Episcopal Conference is 1,262.

== History ==
During the middle ages in Italy, Montaner was the location of the founding of one of the oldest dynasties in the Treviso region, entitled the "da Camino" (Medieval Italian: "da Montanara") before transferring to Oderzo.

In 1966, Giuseppe Faè, the parish priest, died. Following this an election dispute between Giovanni Gava supported by the bishop of Vittorio Veneto, and Antonio Botteon supported by the villagers occurred. Giovanni Gava arrived but was blocked by local villagers. The resulting dispute led to the creation of the Orthodox Church of Montaner which was founded under the Byzantine rite, the resulting schism is known as the Schism of Montaner.

The church suffered a fire on 14 December 2013 which made it unusable and subsequently demolished. While waiting for the reconstruction of a new church, religious services are celebrated at the church of Santa Cecilia in Borgo Val by the Catholic community.
