= Cansiglio =

Plateau in Italy

Coordinates: 46.067°N 12.405°E

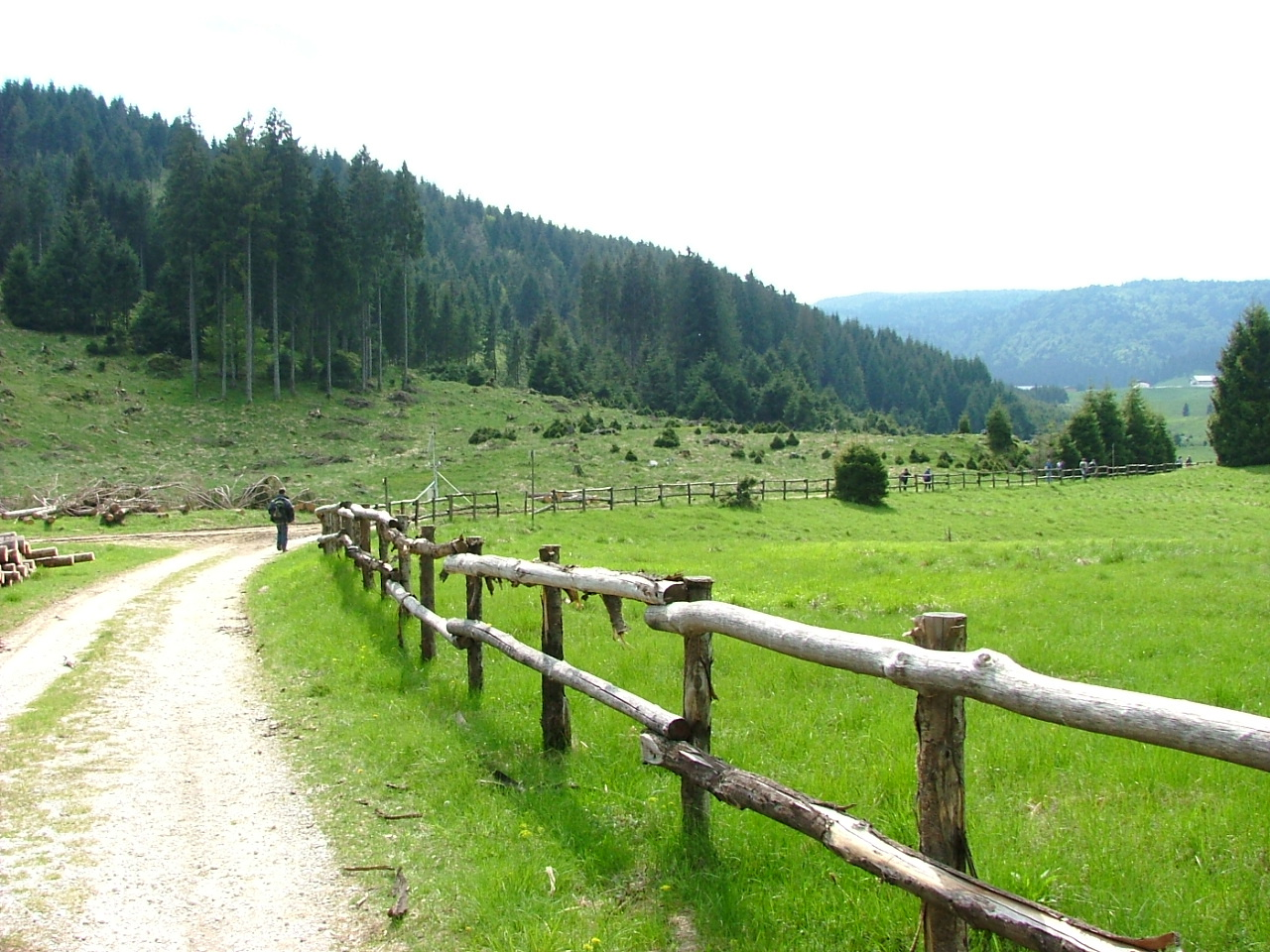
View of the Cansiglio plateau

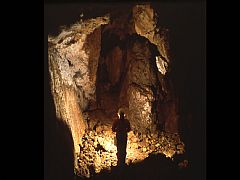
The Bus della Genziana

Cansiglio (Venetian: Canséi or Canséjo) is a plateau in the Alpine foothills of northern Italy, divided between the provinces of Belluno, Treviso and Pordenone.

== Geography ==
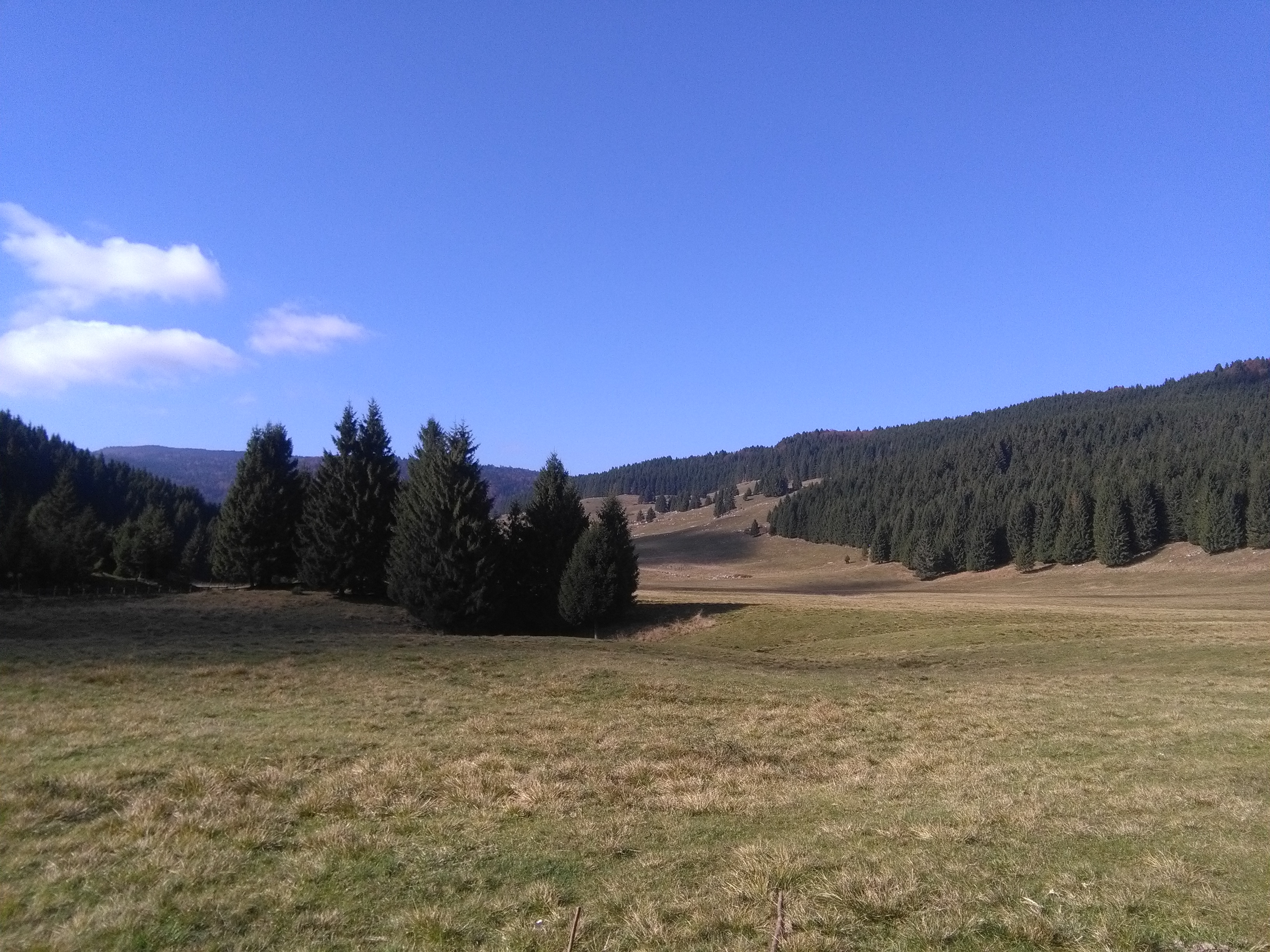
The plateau of the Foresta del Cansiglio

The height of the Cansiglio plateau above sea level is more than 1,000 m (3,300 ft). The surrounding land rises steeply from the Venetian Plain, which borders the western zone of the Carnic Prealps. The plateau includes two large karstic basins: the Pian del Cansiglio and the Piancavallo. These are surrounded by higher ground that rises to a maximum height of 2,200 m (7,200 ft) above sea level and includes rocky peaks such as Monte Costa, the Cima Valsotta, Monte Millifret, Pizzoc and the Monte Cavallo. These mountains separate the Cansiglio from the short Val Lapisina valley.

The outcropping rocks date from the Late Jurassic to the Paleocene. The plateau has a limestone soil and features several examples of karst topography which produces depressions and gorges as well as limestone pavements, sinkholes and residual conical hills. There are over 250 caves in the area, the most famous being the Bus de la Lum, Bus della Genziana and Abisso del Col della Rizza. Their depths are 180 m (590 ft), 585 m (1,920 ft) and 794 m (2,600 ft) respectively. The area also contains several ponors.

Being in what is in effect a depression, the plateau traps cold air, resulting in increased humidity and a climate that is 2° colder than comparable areas at the same altitude. Most of the territory of Cansiglio is covered by woods, mostly local beech, although there are also non-native coniferous trees such as the European spruce. Due to the climatic characteristics of the plateau, the vegetation follows a more inverted distribution than usual: species typical of colder environments occupy the lower altitudes, and those typical of milder ones are at higher altitudes. Anemones grow in large number under the beeches in summer. Large open spaces are used as pastures for sheep and cattle.

The area is at medium-high seismic risk, with earthquakes having occurred in 1936 and 1976.

Since 1982 there have been numerous nature trails on the Cansiglio plateau, laid out to avoid busy roads and houses. They are waymarked with black letters on a red rectangle to try to prevent walkers becoming lost or falling into sinkholes.

=== Climate ===
Climate data for Cansiglio Tramedere ARPAV, 1994–2023 normals, extremes 1992–present
| Month | Jan | Feb | Mar | Apr | May | Jun | Jul | Aug | Sep | Oct | Nov | Dec | Year |
|---|---|---|---|---|---|---|---|---|---|---|---|---|---|
| Record high °C (°F) | 16.1 (61.0) | 19.3 (66.7) | 20.0 (68.0) | 24.1 (75.4) | 27.1 (80.8) | 31.0 (87.8) | 29.9 (85.8) | 30.6 (87.1) | 26.8 (80.2) | 24.5 (76.1) | 22.1 (71.8) | 16.0 (60.8) | 31.0 (87.8) |
| Mean daily maximum °C (°F) | 3.2 (37.8) | 4.9 (40.8) | 7.9 (46.2) | 11.3 (52.3) | 15.5 (59.9) | 19.8 (67.6) | 21.9 (71.4) | 21.9 (71.4) | 17.5 (63.5) | 13.5 (56.3) | 8.1 (46.6) | 3.6 (38.5) | 12.4 (54.3) |
| Daily mean °C (°F) | −3.7 (25.3) | −2.0 (28.4) | 1.5 (34.7) | 5.3 (41.5) | 10.0 (50.0) | 14.1 (57.4) | 15.8 (60.4) | 15.3 (59.5) | 11.2 (52.2) | 7.1 (44.8) | 2.2 (36.0) | −2.7 (27.1) | 6.2 (43.2) |
| Mean daily minimum °C (°F) | −9.0 (15.8) | −7.5 (18.5) | −4.1 (24.6) | −0.6 (30.9) | 4.2 (39.6) | 8.1 (46.6) | 9.7 (49.5) | 9.3 (48.7) | 5.8 (42.4) | 2.1 (35.8) | −2.3 (27.9) | −7.3 (18.9) | 0.7 (33.3) |
| Record low °C (°F) | −24.2 (−11.6) | −23.5 (−10.3) | −27.5 (−17.5) | −14.8 (5.4) | −3.6 (25.5) | −3.6 (25.5) | 0.1 (32.2) | −1.7 (28.9) | −3.7 (25.3) | −13.9 (7.0) | −18.4 (−1.1) | −23.6 (−10.5) | −27.5 (−17.5) |
| Average precipitation mm (inches) | 113.6 (4.47) | 91.8 (3.61) | 116.9 (4.60) | 175.1 (6.89) | 209.2 (8.24) | 167.6 (6.60) | 153.1 (6.03) | 173.3 (6.82) | 166.5 (6.56) | 204.8 (8.06) | 300.8 (11.84) | 172.3 (6.78) | 2,045 (80.51) |
| Average precipitation days (≥ 0.1 mm) | 6 | 6 | 7 | 12 | 15 | 13 | 13 | 12 | 10 | 8 | 9 | 7 | 118 |
Source 1: ARPAV Regional Agency for Environmental Protection and Prevention of Veneto
Source 2: ARPAV (extremes)

== History ==
Prehistoric remains show that the area was inhabited from as early as the 8th millennium BC. The area is mentioned officially for the first time in a document of 923, a diploma used by emperor Berengar I of Italy to donate it to the bishop of Belluno. An 1185 papal bull issued by Lucius III called it Campum silium.

In 1404, together with Belluno, the area became part of Republic of Venice. The Cansiglio forest provided timber for uses such as Venetian shipbuilding and wood for Stradivari's violins, leading to the forest's depletion. After the collapse of Venice and the period of Austrian dominance, the area became the state property of the Kingdom of Italy in the late 19th century.

In the early 1800s, groups of Cimbrian people of German origin began moving to Cansiglio from the village of Roana on the Asiago plateau to engage in artisanal work using wood from the plateau's rich beech forests. They built dwellings made of beech logs and covered with shingles, and they became known for making circular boxes from sheets of beech wood. They spoke a language that was incomprehensible to the people from the surrounding areas. It was a Germanic language called Cimbrian, a dialect of the Bavarian language. Cimbrian has been in decline for centuries and is currently spoken by only a few hundred people. The Cimbrian language island in Cansiglio has practically disappeared and is effectively extinct. Cansiglio now has an Ethnographic and Cimbrian Culture Museum, the Museo regionale dell’Uomo in Cansiglio.

During World War II Cansiglio was the seat of partisan resistance against the German occupation. After a mopping-up operation lasting from late August to early September 1944, which ended in a victory for German forces and those of the Italian Social Republic, the Bus de la Lum was used as an improvised cemetery for casualties from both sides, as well as for local civilians killed by the Germans after the partisans had escaped. All the villages on the plateau were burned down by German troops.
