= Sarmede =

- Comune
- Comune di Sarmede
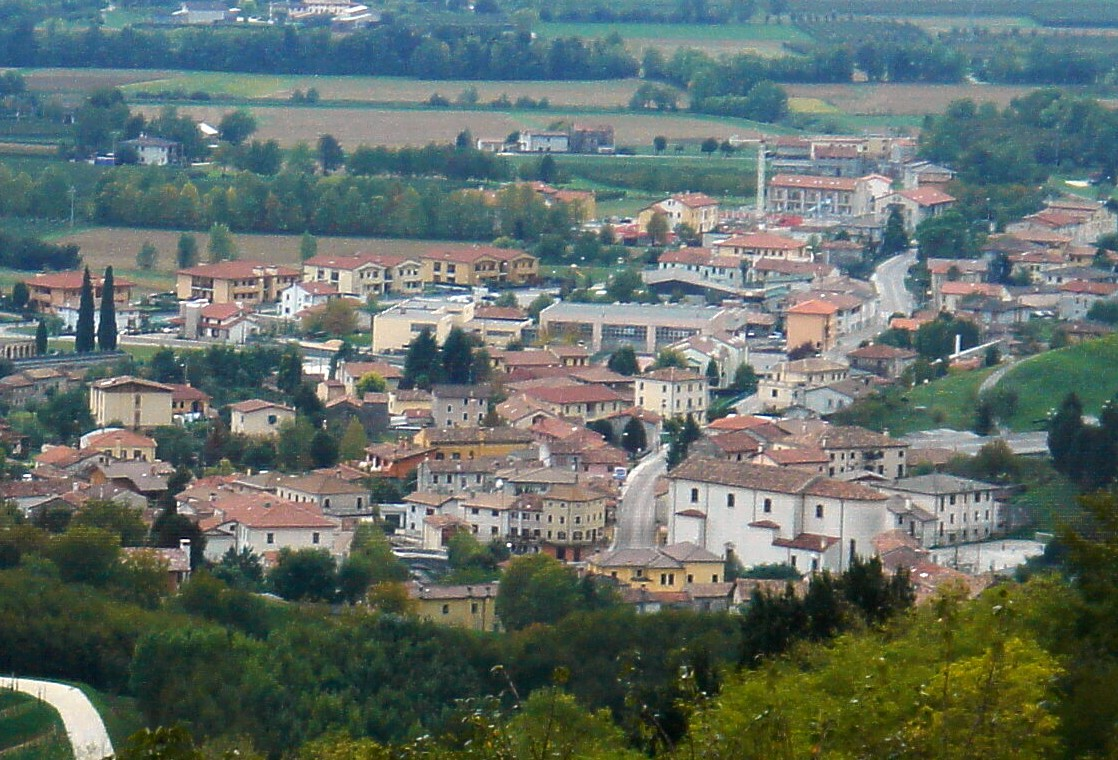
- Panorama of Sarmede

- Location within Italy Location within Veneto
- Coordinates: 45°59′N 12°23′E
- Country: Italy
- Region: Veneto
- Province: Province of Treviso (TV)

Government
  - Mayor: Larry Pizzol

Area
  - Total: 17.9 km^{2} (6.9 sq mi)

Population (30 November 2025)
  - Total: 2,959
  - Density: 165/km^{2} (428/sq mi)
- Time zone: UTC+1 (CET)
  - Summer (DST): UTC+2 (CEST)
- Postal code: 31026
- Dialing code: 0438
- Website: Official website

Sarmede is a comune (municipality) in the Province of Treviso in the Italian region Veneto, located about 60 kilometres (37 mi) north of Venice and about 35 kilometres (22 mi) northeast of Treviso. As of 30 November 2025, it had a population of 2,959 and an area of 17.9 square kilometres (6.9 mi^{2}).

The village is famous for its hamlet Montaner, because during the 1970s the schism of Montaner occurred under the jurisdiction of the future Pope John Paul I.

Sarmede borders the following municipalities: Caneva, Cappella Maggiore, Cordignano, Fregona.

It is known as the land of fairy tales: this sort of "slogan" is due to Štěpán Zavřel, a Czechoslovak painter who in 1982 had the idea of giving rise to an event in which to collect children's illustrations from different cultures: the International Children's Illustration Exhibition. In 1983, with the help of a group of volunteers from the Pro Loco of Sàrmede, the event took place, transforming streets and places into a real "fairytale village".

== Recent history ==
After Napoleon and the Austrians, Sarmede followed the fate of Veneto and became part of the Kingdom of Italy in 1866.

During the Great War, following the rout of Caporetto, Sarmede was occupied by the Central Powers. In the Second World War the partisan resistance was particularly active, especially in the mountain area of Cansiglio.

The post-World War II period saw the growth of poverty and considerable emigration. Only from the sixties there was an economic improvement that led to considerable industrial development.

Of recent history, the well-known schism of Montaner should be mentioned, which saw the parish community of the hamlet oppose Bishop Albino Luciani until the foundation of an Orthodox church.

== Monuments and places of interest ==
=== Religious architecture ===
- The parish church

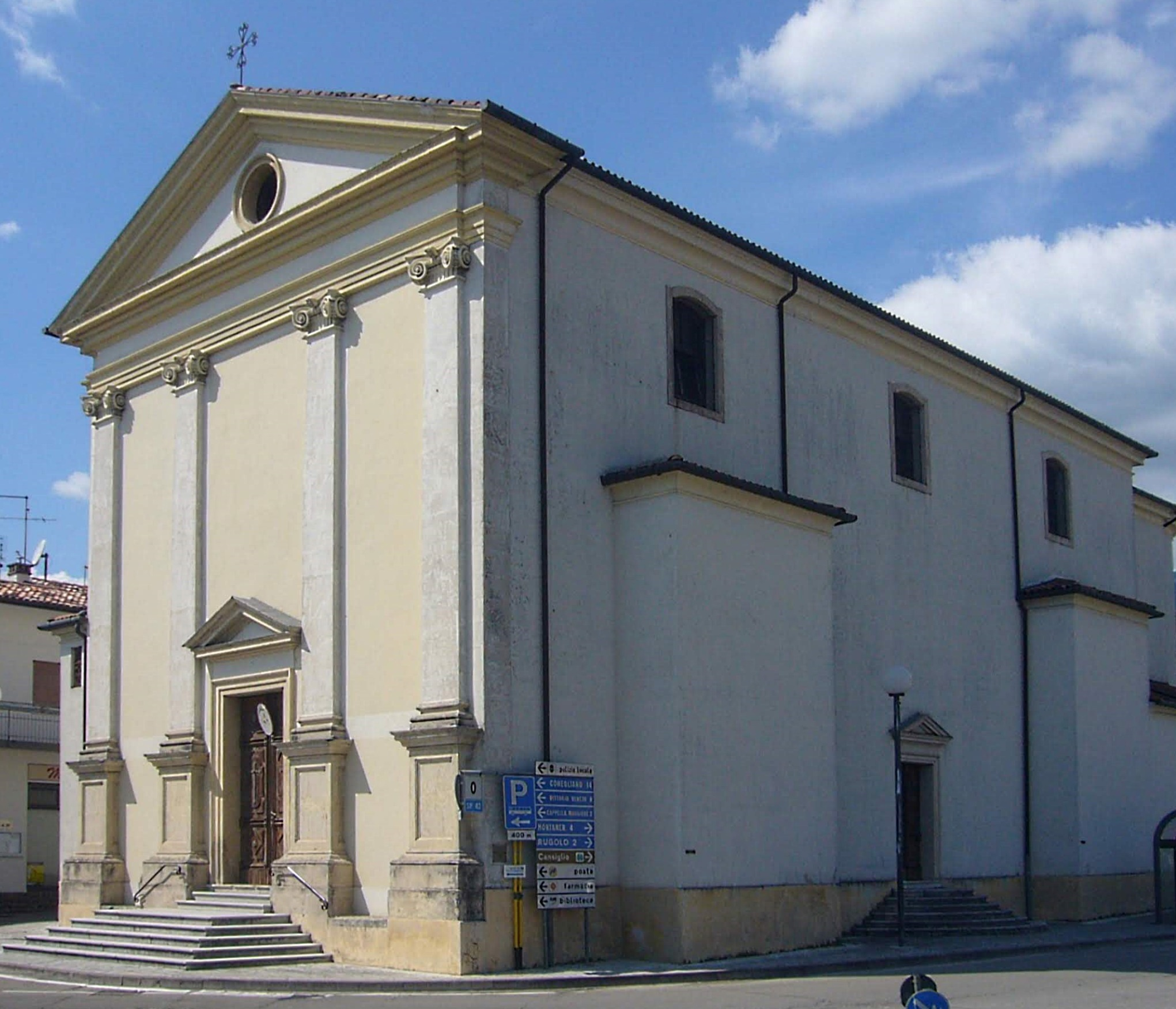
The parish church

Below is a list of sacred buildings of historical and architectural value:

- Church of Sant'Antonio: it is the archpriest of Sarmede, a baroque church of the early nineteenth century, with a simple gabled façade and without a bell tower. Internally it has a fresco by Noè Bordignon Glory of St. Anthony of Padua.
- Church of San Giorgio: it is the church of the hamlet of Rugolo, a structure of Lombard origin that took on its current appearance in the Renaissance and seventeenth centuries.
- Church of San Pancrazio is the parish church of Montaner, built at the end of the nineteenth century.
- Church of Santa Cecilia: located at the eastern end of Montaner, in Val, it is a building from the Caminese period.
- Church of the Madonna di Val: it is located between Rugolo, Palù and Sarmede, it is one of the oldest churches, partially rebuilt in the twentieth century due to an earthquake.

=== Civil architecture ===
Below is a list of the Venetian villas present

- Villa Cimetta Dal Cin (XVI century)
- Casa Da Re (XVII century)
- Casa Favera (XXI century)

== Demographic evolution ==
Historical population

Year	Pop.	±%
1861	?	—
1871	2,488	—
1881	2,517	+1.2%
1901	2,949	+17.2%
1911	3,460	+17.3%
1921	3,811	+10.1%

Year	Pop.	±%
1931	3,866	+1.4%
1936	3,563	−7.8%
1951	3,921	+10.0%
1961	3,394	−13.4%
1971	3,106	−8.5%
1981	3,018	−2.8%

Year	Pop.	±%
1991	2,886	−4.4%
2001	3,004	+4.1%
2011	3,174	+5.7%
2021	2,951	−7.0%

Source: Data from ISTAT

=== Foreign ethnicities and minorities ===
As of January 1st, 2025, foreigners residents in the municipality were 182, i.e. 6.3% of the population. The largest groups are shown below:

1. Romania 48
2. Morocco 33
3. Albania 22
4. Poland 22

== Culture ==
=== Events ===
Every year, from the end of October to the beginning of February, the International Children's Illustration Exhibition takes place.

The 42nd edition of the Exhibition, set up within the spaces of the Casa della Fantasia in the center of the town, will host until February 16, 2025, over two hundred works created by twenty-two illustrators from fourteen countries around the world.

In autumn, with the 2nd and 3rd Sunday of October, there is also the international event called "The Theater Fairs" with street artists, fire-eaters, puppeteers and acrobats.

== Administration ==
Period		Office holder	Party	Title	Notes
2014	2019	Larry Pizzol	Lista Civica - Impegnati per Sarmede-Montaner-Rugolo.	Mayor	
2019	2024	Larry Pizzol	Lista Civica - Impegnati per Sarmede-Montaner-Rugolo.	Mayor	
2024	incumbent	Larry Pizzol	Lista Civica - Impegnati per Sarmede-Montaner-Rugolo.	Mayor	

== People ==
- Štěpán Zavřel (1932–1999), painter, graphic artist, fresco creator and writer
- Gianni De Biasi (1956), coach and former player, who served as head coach of Albania national team
