= Tommaso A. Dragani =

Italian genetic epidemiologist

- Born: Ortona, Italy
- Education: University of Bologna (Graduation with honors); University of Milano (Master in Medical Statistics and Statistical Methods in Epidemiology)
- Occupations: Cancer researcher, Genetic epidemiologist, toxicologist

Tommaso A. Dragani is an Italian genetic epidemiologist whose research is focused on understanding the genetic control of complex phenotypes.

Results from his studies allowed the chromosomal mapping of quantitative trait loci (QTLs) modulating the genetic predisposition to liver, lung and skin tumorigenesis, in animal models. His population-based studies resulted in the identification of genetic polymorphisms associated with the risk and prognosis of lung cancer. He contributed to discovering the mechanism underlying the association between polymorphisms in nicotinic acetylcholine receptor subunit genes on chromosome 15 and the risks of lung cancer and nicotine dependence. He contributed with a genome-wide study to the pharmacogenomics of pain relief in response to opioid therapy for cancer pain.

== Biography ==
Dragani was born in Ortona, Italy, and studied pharmacy at the University of Bologna where he received and MPharm degree in 1977. He then joined the National Cancer Institute in Milan as a researcher.

From June 1984 to June 1985, he was visiting scientist at the laboratory of Bernard Weinstein, Columbia University, and from September 1996 to February 1997 he was visiting scientist at the National Cancer Center Japan, working with Minako Nagao.

In 1998, Dragani was appointed Director of the Genetic Epidemiology and Pharmacogenomics Research Unit at the National Cancer Institute in Milan. In 2007 he achieved a Masters in Medical Statistics and Statistical Methods in Epidemiology by the University of Milan.

== Achievements ==
Tommaso A. Dragani identified genetic loci that influence the hereditary predisposition to liver cancer (Cancer Res. 1993;53:209-11), lung cancer (Nat Genet. 1993;3:132-6; Nat Genet.1996;12:455-7), and skin cancer (Oncogene. 2000;19:5324-8). He characterized genes involved in the hereditary predisposition to lung cancer in mice and identified genetic loci that modulate the expression of these genes (PLoS Genet. 2014;10:e1004307; Cancer Lett. 2016;375:221-230).

He conducted a genome-wide association study (GWAS) between genetic polymorphisms and lung cancer (J Clin Oncol. 2006;24:1672-8). He demonstrated that polymorphisms in the CHRNA5 gene promoter modulated the transcription of this gene, and thereby showed that genetic variants affected the risks of lung cancer and nicotine dependence (J Natl Cancer Inst. 2010;102:1366-70; Carcinogenesis. 2013;34:1281-5).

He did a GWAS on pain relief in cancer patients treated with opioids, demonstrating that different genetic loci control the individual response to this therapy (Clin Cancer Res. 2011;17:4581-7).

He discovered the tumor-promoting activity of 1,4-bis[2-(3,5-dichloropyridiloxy)]benzene (TCPOBOP), a constitutive androstan receptor agonist ( [12] and he characterized carcinogenicity of 2,3,7,8-tetrachlorodibenzo-p-dioxin (TCDD).

== Memberships ==
Tommaso A. Dragani participated as a member of International Working Groups on cancer research. In particular, he was Member of six IARC Monographs Working Groups on the Evaluation of Carcinogenic Risks to Humans.

He, also, served as a Member of the International Lung Cancer Consortium (ILCCO), an organization that aims to share data from ongoing lung cancer case-control and cohort studies, in particular regarding genetic association studies. The overall objectives are to reduce duplication of research effort, replicate novel findings, and afford substantial cost savings through large collaborative efforts.

== Publications ==
Tommaso A. Dragani published more than 180 peer-reviewed articles. His H-index is 40 (ResearchGate) and he has a ResearchGate score of 44.77.

He is author of Human Polygenic Diseases: Animal Models.

== See also ==
- Renato Talamini
