= Ceneda =

Ceneda may refer to:

- Ceneda, Italy, frazione of Vittorio Veneto
  - Duchy of Ceneda, medieval Lombard duchy of which Ceneda was capital
  - Diocese of Ceneda, now part of the Roman Catholic Diocese of Vittorio Veneto
