= Štěpán Zavřel =

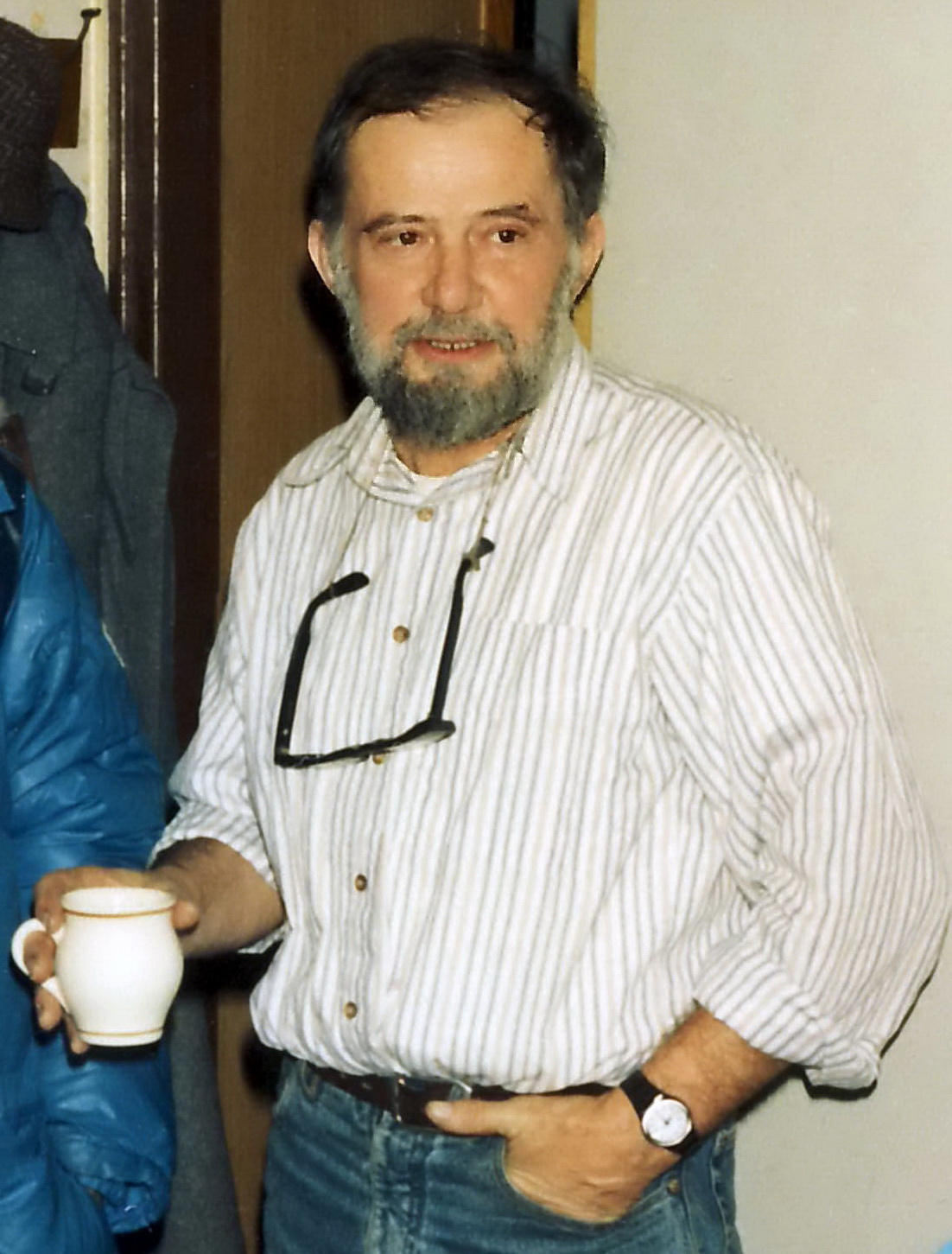
- Štěpán Zavřel
- Born: 26 December 1932; Prague, Czechoslovakia
- Died: 25 February 1999 (aged 66); Rugolo (Sarmede)
- Education: Accademia di Belle Arti di Roma
- Known for: graphic arts, illustrating, painting
- Notable work: the illustration of the Bible for children - Mit Gott unterwegs, Die Bibel für Kinder und Erwachsene neu erzählt (Bohem Press, 1996)
- Movement: Scuola Internazionale d’Illustrazione (The international school of Illustration)
- Patrons: Jiří Trnka

Štěpán Zavřel (25 December 1932 – 25 February 1999) was a Czech painter, fresco creator, graphic artist, and writer.

He lived and studied in Czechoslovakia until 1959, then he emigrated to Italy. There he studied at Accademia di Belle Arti di Roma. Afterwards he traveled through the whole of Europe, during which time he arranged exhibitions of his own works. In 1968 he finally settled in Rugolo, a small village in the region Veneto in Italy, where he lived until his death in 1999. In 1971, he co-founded the Zürich-based publishing house Bohem Press with Otakar Božejovský. Štěpán Zavřel founded there The International School of Illustration which exists till now.

== Legacy ==
In 2009, on the tenth anniversary of his death, a collection of accounts by those who knew him was published in the Czech Republic. In 2011, a museum dedicated to his works (Museo Artistico Štěpán Zavřel of Spazio Brazzà (Udine - Italy)) was established.

Wanted by Štěpán's friend Corrado Pirzio-Biroli, with the approval of Zavřel's family, the museum researches on the production of the artist and catalogues his works, including the ones donated by private persons. It also contains the heredity of the family of the artist, that is more than 3.000 originals among them unpublished xylographs from the beginning of 60's, studies, pictures and films for animation cinema, advertising graphics, sketches, storyboards and original figures of all his illustrated books for children from The Magic Fish of 1964, carried out in Brazzà Castle, to his last great work, the Bible for adults and children, Mit Gott unterwegs, Die Bibel für Kinder und Erwachsene neu erzählt of 1996.

The 'Centro Internazionale di Studi per la Cultura dell'Infanzia Štěpán Zavřel' of Spazio Brazzà creates and promotes cultural projects at the local level, in collaboration with other international organizations and institutions with particular attention to the picture book and the different forms of art directed to the child. The Centre in addition to doing research on the artist, in fact, promotes the planning of museum activities as a result of proposals arising from field research, in collaboration with experts in the field; among other projects the one of republishing or editing from scratch in collaboration with the historic Bohem Press publishing house founded by Štěpán Zavřel in the seventies, winning many awards and international recognitions for the environmental and the beauty of the images shown, guiding and supporting them with special projects especially aimed at schools. In 2013, the theatre performance 'Venice: Town of Hope', from Zavrel's book 'Sotto la laguna di Venezia' has been held at the prestigious Ivan's Franko National Drama Theatre in Kyiv, a collaboration between the Centro Internazionale di Studi per la Cultura dell'Infanzia Štěpán Zavřel' of Spazio Brazzà, the Structural Subdivision of the German - Polish - Ukrainian Society and The Centre for Children in Need 'Our Kids' in Kyiv.

== Works ==
=== Illustrations ===
- Maria, Francesca Gagliardi; Der Zauberfisch (Annette Betz, 1966)
- Zavřel, Štěpán; Sie folgen dem Stern (Patmos, 1967)
- Zavřel, Štěpán; Salz ist mehr als Gold (Nord-Süd Verlag, 1968)
- Grimm, Brüder; Sterntaler (Patmos, 1969)
- Guardini, Romano; Kreuzweg unseres Herrn und Heilandes (Křesťanská akadmie, 1970)
- Zavřel, Štěpán; Die Geschichte eines Wassermanns (Nord-Süd Verlag, 1970)
- Wölfel, Ursula; Erde, unsere schöner Stern (Patmos, 1971)
- Zavřel, Štěpán; Die verlorene Sonne (Nord-Süd, 1973)
- Zavřel, Štěpán; Venedig morgen (Bohem Press, 1974)
- Zavřel, Štěpán; Peter und Hansi (Gakken, 1975)
- Zavřel, Štěpán; Der letze Baum (Bohem Press, 1977)
- Bolliger, Max; Die Kinderbrücke (Bohem Press, 1977)
- Zavřel, Štěpán; The Last Tree (Macdonald and Jane's, 1978)
- Bolliger, Max; Das Hirtenlied (Bohem Press, 1978)
- Zavřel, Štěpán; Der Schmetterling (Bohem Press, 1980)
- Bolliger, Max; De Bernebrege (Algemiene Fryske Underrjocht Kommisje, 1981)
- Zavřel, Štěpán; In Betlehem geboren (Patmos, 1981)
- Zavřel, Štěpán; Mein erstes Weihnachtsbuch (Patmos, 1982)
- Zavřel, Štěpán; Grossvater Thomas (Bohem Press, 1983)
- Eiichi, Sekine; Fushigina kusa no himitsu (Gakken, 1984)
- Bolliger, Max; Les nains de la montagne (Bohem Press, 1985)
- Bolliger, Max; Die Riesenberge (Bohem Press, 1985)
- Hasler, Evelin; Die Blumenstadt (Bohem Press, Zürich 1987, ISBN 3-7269-0014-4)
- Maury, Brigitte and Paravel, Dominique; Sous la lagune de Venise (Bohem Press, 1987)
- Zavřel, Štěpán und Naumann, Dieter; Der Garten des Tobias (Peters, 1988)
- Škutina, Vladimír; Ukradený Ježíšek (Bohem Press, 1988)
- Bolliger, Max; Jakob der Gaukler (Bohem Press, 1991)
- Zavřel, Štěpán; Liétajuci deduško (Bohem Press, 1991)
- Bolliger, Max; Jona (Lehrmittelverlag, 1994)
- Schindler, Regine; Mit Gott unterwegs, Die Bibel für Kinder und Erwachsene neu erzählt (Bohem Press, 1996)

=== Publications ===
- Zavřel, Štěpán; Sie folgen dem Stern (Patmos, 1967)
- Zavřel, Štěpán; Salz ist mehr als Gold (Nord-Süd Verlag, 1967)
- Zavřel, Štěpán; Die Geschichte eines Wassermanns (Nord-Süd Verlag, 1970)
- Zavřel, Štěpán; Die verlorene Sonne (Nord-Süd, 1973)
- Zavřel, Štěpán; Venedig morgen (Bohem Press, 1974)
- Zavřel, Štěpán; Peter und Hansi (Gakken, 1975)
- Zavřel, Štěpán; Der letze Baum (Bohem Press, 1977)
- Zavřel, Štěpán; The Last Tree (Macdonald and Jane's, 1978)
- Zavřel, Štěpán; Der Schmetterling (Bohem Press, 1980)
- Zavřel, Štěpán; In Betlehem geboren (Patmos, 1981)
- Zavřel, Štěpán; Mein erstes Weihnachtsbuch (Patmos, 1982)
- Zavřel, Štěpán; Grossvater Thomas (Bohem Press, 1984)
- Zavřel, Štěpán und Naumann, Dieter; Der Garten des Tobias (Peters, 1988)
- Zavřel, Štěpán; Liétajuci deduško (Bohem Press, 1991)
