= Schism of Montaner =

Conversion of an Italian village to Eastern Orthodoxy

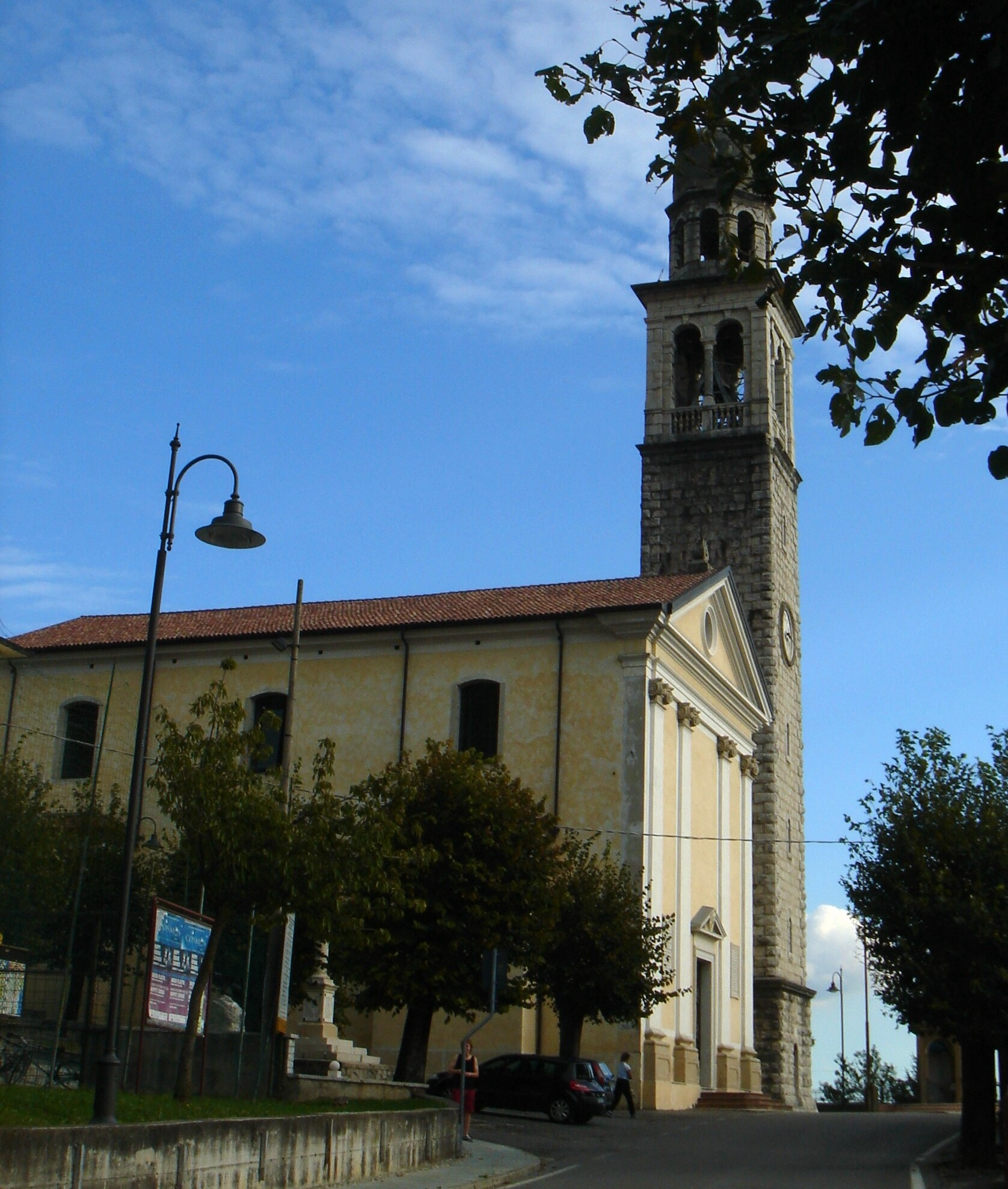
The Catholic church of Montaner, dedicated to Saint Pancras

In the Schism of Montaner (Italian: Scisma di Montaner) between 1967 and 1969, almost all residents of the Italian village of Montaner renounced Catholicism and converted to Eastern Orthodoxy. This was due to a disagreement with the bishop of Vittorio Veneto, Albino Luciani, the future Pope John Paul I, over the appointment of the local priest.

== Montaner frazione ==
Montaner or Montanèr is a frazione of the commune of Sarmede, in the province of Treviso, in the region of Veneto. It is 2.3 km from the municipality of Sarmede, to which it belongs.

== Background ==
On December 13, 1966, Giuseppe Faè, the parish priest, died. Faè, who had served the community for forty years, had proven popular with the people of Montaner. He aided in obtaining electricity and running water for the village, the construction of a new school, and even aided in the organization of anti-fascist resistance to the German occupation. After his death, the bishop of Vittorio Veneto decided to appoint Giovanni Gava as the new priest, which was unpopular among the villagers. They instead supported Antonio Botteon, who, for a long time, had assisted the old priest.

On January 21, 1967, the new priest arrived in town; however, the night before his arrival, the townspeople erected a wall blocking the entrance of the church and a mob of townspeople prevented him from carrying out his work.

== Schism ==
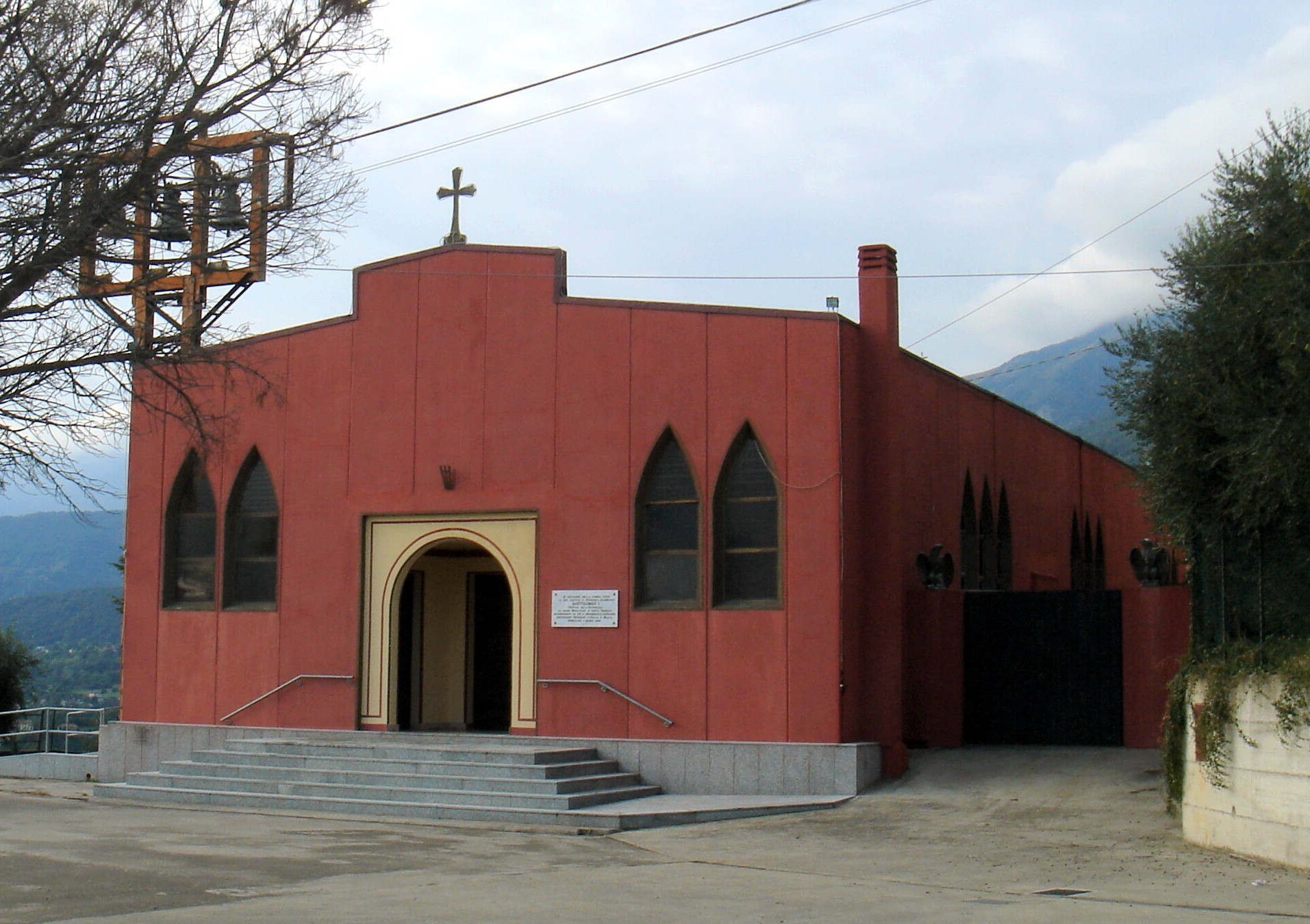
The Orthodox Church of Montaner

The people then founded the Eastern Orthodox Church of Montaner. On December 26, 1967, the first Divine Liturgy was celebrated with the Eastern Orthodox Byzantine rite. The Eastern Orthodox priest, Claudio Vettorazzo, was permanently installed in June 1969 and on September 7, 1969, the Eastern Orthodox church was blessed. Residents of the village recall that the initial time period after the schism resulted in "hatred" and "confusion" within the village.

In 1994, Vettorazzo was imprisoned because of legal and financial problems.

Today, the Catholic and Eastern Orthodox communities still exist within the village, though divisions remain.

The church suffered a fire on December 14, 2013. In the following years, a project was implemented for the reconstruction of the church and the monastery with anti-seismic systems.

== See also ==
- Schism
- Old and New Light
