= Serravalle =

Serravalle (Italian, meaning "place where the valley narrows", and less often meaning "a fortification") may refer to:

== Italy ==
=== Municipalities ===
- Serravalle a Po, in the province of Mantua
- Serravalle di Chienti, in the province of Macerata
- Serravalle Langhe, in the province of Cuneo
- Serravalle Pistoiese, in the province of Pistoia; the commune also includes the frazioni of Serravalle Scalo and Ponte di Serravalle
- Serravalle Scrivia, in the province of Alessandria
- Serravalle Sesia, in the province of Vercelli
- Castello di Serravalle, a frazione of Valsamoggia in the Metropolitan City of Bologna

=== Other places ===
- Serravalle (Vittorio Veneto), a district of Vittorio Veneto
- Serravalle, a small settlement in the commune of Ala, Trentino
- Serravalle, a small settlement in the commune of Asti, Piedmont
- Serravalle, a small settlement in the commune of Berra, Emilia-Romagna
- Serravalle, a small settlement in the commune of Bibbiena, Tuscany
- Serravalle, Buonconvento, a small settlement in the commune of Buonconvento, Tuscany
- Serravalle, a small settlement in the commune of Filattiera, Tuscany
- Serravalle, a small settlement in the commune of Norcia, Umbria
- Serravalle, a small settlement in the commune of Ortonovo, Liguria
- Serravalle, a small settlement in the commune of Piasco, Piedmont
- Serravalle, a small settlement in the commune of Varano de' Melegari, Emilia-Romagna
- Casali di Serravalle, a small settlement in the commune of Norcia, Umbria
- Serravalle di Carda, a small settlement in the commune of Apecchio, Marche
- Valdara di Serravalle, a small settlement in the commune of Apecchio, Marche
- Castle of Serravalle, a medieval castle in Bosa, Sardinia

== San Marino ==
- Serravalle, San Marino, a Sammarinese castello

== Switzerland ==
- Serravalle, Switzerland, a municipality in the canton of Ticino

== People with the surname ==
- Giovanni da Serravalle (1350–1445), Italian Franciscan and humanist

== See also ==
- Frank Seravalli, American sports reporter
