= Carlo La Vecchia =

Italian epidemiologist (born 1955)

- Born: February 27, 1955 (age 71); Milan, Italy
- Education: University of Milan
- Known for: work on risks in cancer and other chronic diseases
- Awards: Order of Merit of the Italian Republic, Commander
- Scientific career
- Fields: Epidemiology
- Workplaces: Mario Negri Institute for Pharmacological Research, University of Milan, International Prevention Research Institute

Carlo La Vecchia (born February 27, 1955) is an Italian epidemiologist. He is doing research on chronic diseases, where he contributed to the understanding of the risks related to diet, tobacco, oral contraceptive use and occupational or environmental exposure to toxic substances in cancer and other chronic diseases development.

== Biography ==
La Vecchia was born in Milan, Italy, studied medicine at the University of Milan and received a Doctor of Medicine degree with honors in 1979, after which he has joined the Mario Negri Institute for Pharmacological Research in Milan.

From 1981 to 1983 he was a Research Fellow at the Department of Community Medicine and Medical Practice, University of Oxford, where he received a M.Sc. in Clinical Medicine (Epidemiology).

Going back to Milan he received an additional Diploma from the Post-Graduate School, Mario Negri Institute, where he took the position of Head, Laboratory of Epidemiology, in 1989. Meantime he had started working also for the University of Milan and was awarded Associate Professorship of Epidemiology at the Institute of Medical Statistics and Biometrics also in 1989. After becoming a Visiting Lecturer in the Department of Epidemiology, Harvard School of Public Health, Boston, USA (1994–1995), La Vecchia became Adjunct Associate Professor of Epidemiology (1996 to 2001). As of 2002 he was adjunct professor of medicine at the School of Medicine, Vanderbilt University, Nashville, USA. The Eastman Dental Institute, University College London, awarded him an Honorary Senior Lecturer in Oral Medicine(1996–2001).

In 2007 Carlo La Vecchia was promoted Head, Department of Epidemiology at Mario Negri. In the same year he became a Senior Fellow of the International Agency for Research on Cancer, Lyon, France (2007–2009). Since 2008 he also holds an Adjunct Professorship of Epidemiology at the University of Lausanne, Switzerland. In 2009 he became co-founder of the International Prevention Research Institute, a research and consulting company based in Lyon, France.

Carlo La Vecchia is also a Registered Journalist in Milan (Elenco pubblicisti No. 52412). He is married to Eva Negri.

== Scientific merits ==
La Vecchia's specific fields of research are Cancer epidemiology (case-control studies on cancers of the breast, female genital tract, digestive sites, urinary organs, lymphoreticular malignancies, etc.); epidemiological studies on the risk related to diet, tobacco, oral contraceptive use and occupational or environmental exposure to toxic substances; coordination of clinical trials; analysis of temporal trends and of geographical distribution of mortality from cancer, cardiovascular diseases, perinatal and other selected conditions.

He is a member of several international research consortia, including the INHANCE (International Head and Neck Cancer Epidemiology) consortium, which he joined in 2004.

La Vecchia is a member of many advisory and/or research committees, both nationally and internationally, e.g. Member of the UICC - American Cancer Society Fellowship Committee (1991–95); Member of the "Steering Committee" of the international cooperative network of case-control of the SEARCH Programme of the International Agency for Research on Cancer, IARC/WHO (1989–1991); Member of the executive committee of the European Society for Human Reproduction (ESHRE) (1991–95); Member of the Steering Committee, Collaborative Group on Hormonal Factors and Breast Cancer, and Chief, Steering Committee, Collaborative Group of Hormonal Factors and Cervical Cancers, both Oxford and IARC; He was a Member of the Ethical Committee, Centro di Riferimento Oncologico, Aviano PN, Italy (1998–2000); Member of the Scientific Committee, Air Quality Project, Fondazione Lombardia Ambiente, Regione Lombardia (1998–2000) and Member of the CPMP Ad hoc Expert Group on Oral Contraceptives and Cardiovascular Risks, EMEA, London, 1998–2001. Carlo is a founding member of the International Academy of Oral Oncology. La Vecchia has participated and chaired several Working Groups during IARC's Monograph programme, e.g. Monograph 51 on Coffee, Tea, Mate, Methylxanthines and Methylglyoxal, 1990; Monograph 72 on the Evaluation of Carcinogenic Risks to Human. Monographs 72 and Member Monographs 91 on Hormonal Contraception and Post-menopausal Hormonal Therapy, 1998 and 2005, and 95 on Alcohol, 2007. He is a Member of the Scientific Review Committee of the UNDP/WHO/World Bank Human Reproduction Programme(since 2000) and a Member of the Scientific Committee, Foundation for the Advancement of the Mediterranean Diet, Barcelona, Spain (since 2002).

Carlo La Vecchia was editor of several scientific journals in his field, like the European Journal of Public Health (1993–2003) or the Journal of Epidemiology and Biostatistics (1996–2002). He currently is Associate Editor of the journals European Journal of Cancer Prevention and Cancer Letter. He also serves or was serving at the editorial board of the following journals: Alimentazione e Prevenzione (since 2000); American Journal of Epidemiology (1991–97); Archives of Medical Science (since 2007); Asian Pacific Journal of Cancer Prevention (since 2000); Cancer Causes and Control (1991–96); Current Cancer Therapy Reviews (since 2005); Dermatology Research and Practice (since 2007); Digestive and Liver Disease (since 2001); Economia Politica del Farmaco (since 2004); European Journal of Cancer (1991–95); European Journal of Cancer Prevention (since 1991); European Journal of Clinical Nutrition (since 1996); European Journal of Nutrition (since 1998); In Scope Oncology & Haematology (since 2004); International Journal of Cancer (since 2000); Journal of Nephrology (since 1992); Maturitas (since 2008); Nutrition and Cancer (since 2000); Oncology (1994–1995); Open Cancer Journal (since 2007); Oral Oncology (since 2003); Revisiones en Ginecologia y Obstetricia (since 2000); Revista Española de Nutrición Comunitaria (since 1996); Revue d'Epidémiologie et de Santé Publique (since 1991); Sozial und Praeventivmedizin (1990–2001); The Lancet, edizione italiana (2005–2008); Tumori (since 1993).

Carlo La Vecchia has published more than 1750 scientific articles and is an ISI highly cited researcher

== Awards ==
- 1991: European Visiting Professor to the Royal Society of Medicine
- 1993: GlaxoSmithKline Prize for medical publication
- 2006: Order of Merit of the Italian Republic, Commander for scientific achievements
