= Pizzoc =

Mountain in Italy

Coordinates: 46°02′27″N 12°20′47″E

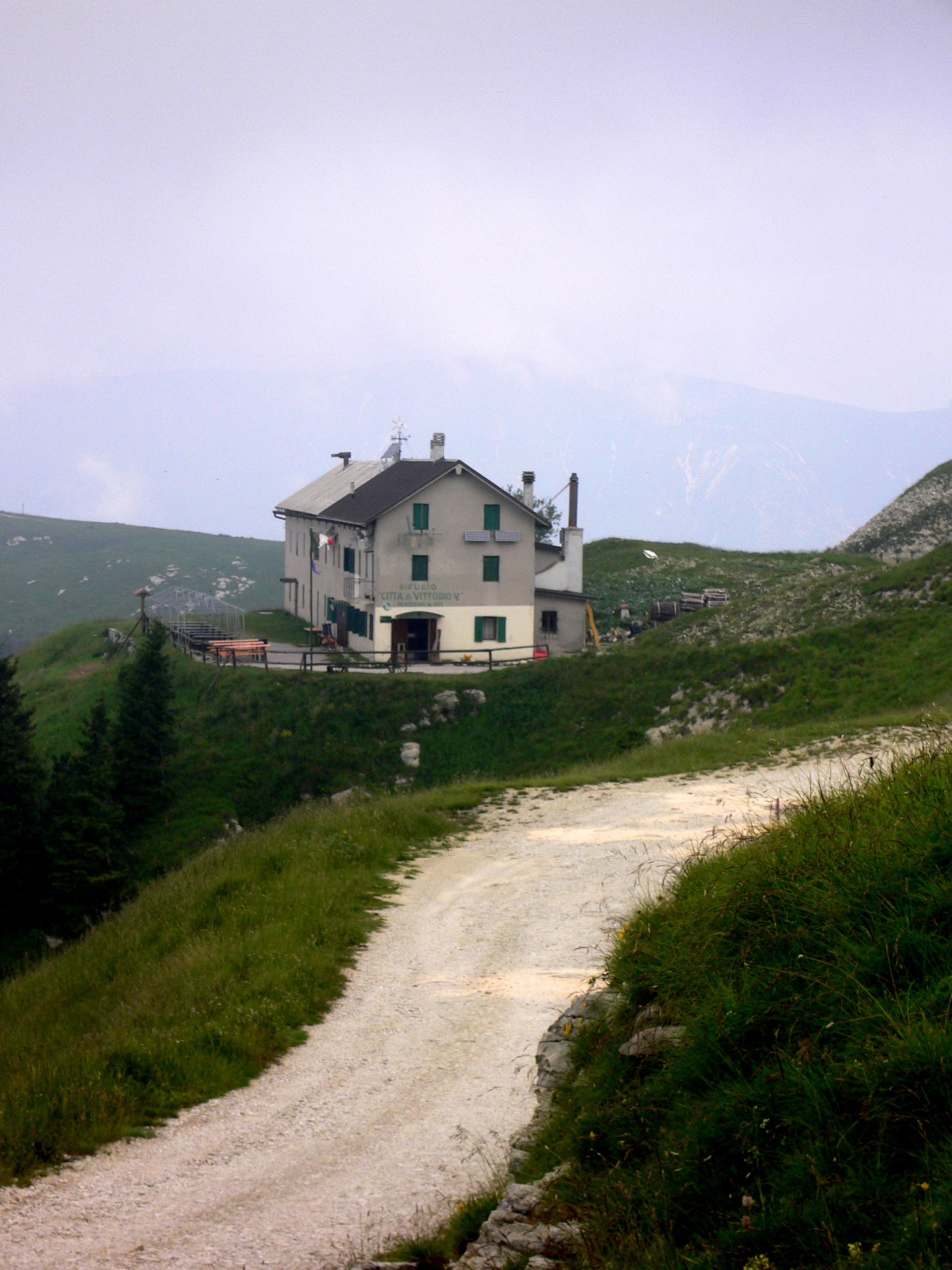

Highest point
- Elevation: 1,565 m (5,135 ft)

Geography
- Location: Veneto, Italy

Pizzoc is a mountain of the Veneto, Italy. It has an elevation of 1,565 metres, and is the highest point of the comune of Fregona; one source states its height as 1,525 meters and its oronymy or meaning is "small point".

Pizzoc is an important passage for migrating passerine birds.
