= Monte Millifret =

Mountain in Italy

- Location within Italy

Highest point
- Elevation: 1,581 m (5,187 ft)
- Prominence: 454 m (1,490 ft)
- Coordinates: 46°03′14″N 12°20′55″E

Geography
- Location: Veneto, Italy

Monte Millifret is a mountain in the Veneto region of Italy. It has an elevation of 1,581 metres.
