= Vicariate of Valpolicella =

Historical administrative division of the Republic of Venice

Vicariate of Valpolicella Vicariato della Valpolicella
- 1405–1806
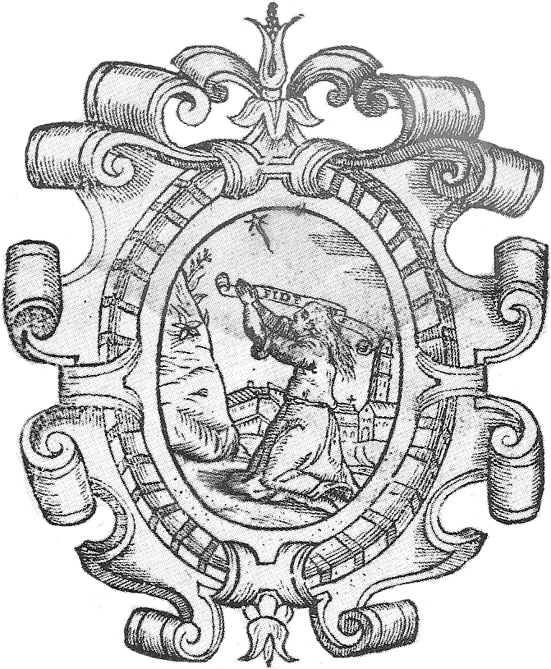
- Coat of arms of the Vicariate of Valpolicella as depicted on the title page of Privilegia et iura Communitatis et Hominum Vallis Pulicellae, a 16th-century essay written by Giangiacomo Pigari.

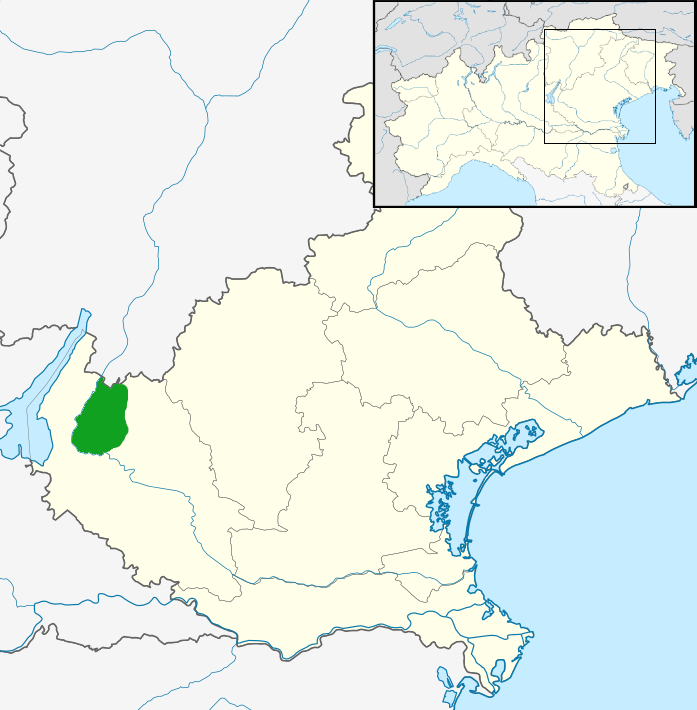
- Location of the Vicariate of Valpolicella (in green) in today's Veneto.
- Capital: San Pietro in Cariano
- Population
  - 1630: 11,769
- History
  - Devotion of Verona to Venice: 1405
  - Established: 1405
  - Disestablished: 1806
  - Peace of Pressburg: 1806
- Political subdivisions: Piovadeghi

The Vicariate of Valpolicella was an administrative entity created under the Venetian Republic following Verona's devotion to Venice in 1405, encompassing the Valpolicella territories that already constituted the County of Valpolicella established in the previous century by the Scaligers.

Throughout its existence, the Vicariate was able to enjoy an advantageous tax system, administrative autonomy, and certain privileges, such as being able to elect its own vicar. These concessions were made both because of the wealth of the territory and because of the need to be able to count on its loyalty being a border land. During the four centuries of the entity's existence, the territory was able to prosper, as evidenced by the many Venetian villas that were built there, and it was only marginally affected by the events of war that took place in neighboring territories. Even the underprivileged classes enjoyed relative affluence, when compared to the average of the time, but there was no shortage of epidemics and cases of malnutrition. Population growth was more or less constant, excluding the years when the region was affected by exceptional plague epidemics, such as the one in 1630 that caused the death of two-thirds of the inhabitants.

At the head of the vicariate was a vicar elected annually from among the patrician citizens of Verona, who took office on the first day of February, after a procession starting from Porta San Giorgio in Verona. He was assisted in his office by, among others, two notaries, an auditor, and four officers. The government was governed by the Council of Eighteen, this one elected for three years. Initially the Vicariate did not have a clearly defined seat, but from 1452 onward it is certain that it was established in the Domus Valli Pulicelle in San Pietro in Cariano.

With the final fall of the Venetian Republic and the subsequent Peace of Pressburg, on May 1, 1806, Veneto returned under the rule of the French, who abrogated the vicariates, including the Valpolicella one. Along with it disappeared the autonomies and privileges the territory had enjoyed for over four centuries.

== Sources ==
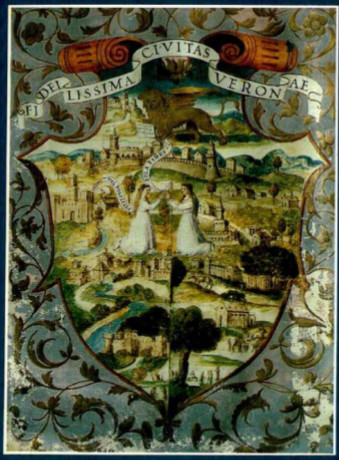
Miniature present in the essay Privilegia et iura Communitatis et Hominum Vallis Pulicellae.

There are several primary sources that allow us to reconstruct the administrative and judicial organization of the Vicariate of Valpolicella. One of the most important ones is the essay Privilegia et iura Communitatis et Hominum Vallis Pulicellae by the Negrarese jurist and poet Giangiacomo Pigari. Published in 1588, in it the author offers a detailed analysis of the Vicariate through a collection of all pre-existing legal material organizing it by subject. The text is accompanied by a dedication to the vicar Orazio Marani, as well as a carmen entitled Ad Nimphas Pulcellidas. Inside there is also a valuable miniature traditionally attributed to the painter Giovanni Caroto, although there are doubts about this.

Another primary source is a collection of rules and institutes called Ordini, e Consuetudini, che si osservano nell'Offitio del Vicariato della Valpolicella. Four editions were produced with updates occurring in the years 1635, 1676, 1678, and finally 1731.

At the State Archives of Verona the original archival fund of the Vicariate is preserved. Substantially in good condition, it is, however, lacking the documents related to the 15th century, probably because in those early years a fixed location for the institution had not yet been chosen. The earliest available records, although chronologically fragmentary, date from 1491.

In addition, news about the ecclesiastical organization and the status of churches and parishes in the area can be reconstructed through the accounts of pastoral visits conducted in the valley by Veronese bishops Ermolao Barbaro (mid-15th century) and Gian Matteo Giberti (16th century).

== History ==
=== Origins: the County of Valpolicella ===
Coat of arms of the Scaligeri. The Lords of Verona were the ones who founded the county of Valpolicella, which was ruled by Federico della Scala.

When the bloody rule of Ezzelino III da Romano ended, the city of Verona appointed in 1259 Leonardino della Scala as its podestà and, the following year, captain of the people. This was the beginning of the city's seigniory of the Scaligeri family.

In the following years, the della Scala family greatly expanded their possessions, reaching its greatest extent with Cangrande, who came to rule over almost the entirety of today's Veneto, part of Emilia Romagna and Lombardy. As a result of the power they acquired, the Scaligers often faced internal struggles and opponents from the Guelph faction.

Beginning in 1276 Valpolicella, which was then divided into several feudal estates, thus found itself under the rule of the Scaligeri, becoming part of the seven "Colonels" into which the District of Verona was divided, namely, Gardesana, Montagna, Valpantena, Tione, Zosana, Fiumenovo and, precisely, Valpolicella, each of which was governed by a different apparatus. In 1311 Vallis Pulicella gained further autonomy, both administratively and judicially, by being granted the rank of county.

Many of the Valpolicella fiefdoms confiscated from the Sambonifacio, Guelph enemies of the Scaligeri, were entrusted to Federico della Scala, at that time podestà of Verona. They included the localities of Volargne, the Ceraino Sluice, Ponton (which boasted a harbor on the Adige River), and Marano with its castle. Federico, a staunch supporter of Emperor Henry VII, received confirmation of his powers over these fiefdoms from the latter on February 11, 1311, while on September 15 of the same year he was granted dominion over more or less the entire territory of today's Valpolicella.

Settling in the castle of Marano, which he had in the meantime restored and fortified, Federico began to administer the county assisted by the nobleman Ottonello da Ponton. On January 24, 1314, the two lords entered into a treaty regulating relations between the county and the city of Verona to protect their mutual interests.

After participating in an unsuccessful conspiracy against Cangrande della Scala, lord of Verona, Federico fell into such ruin that on September 14, 1325, he was forced to flee into exile in Trent. With his demise, the era of the County of Valpolicella also came to an end and its territories were incorporated into the District of Verona, partially losing their independence.

=== The arrival of the Republic of Venice ===
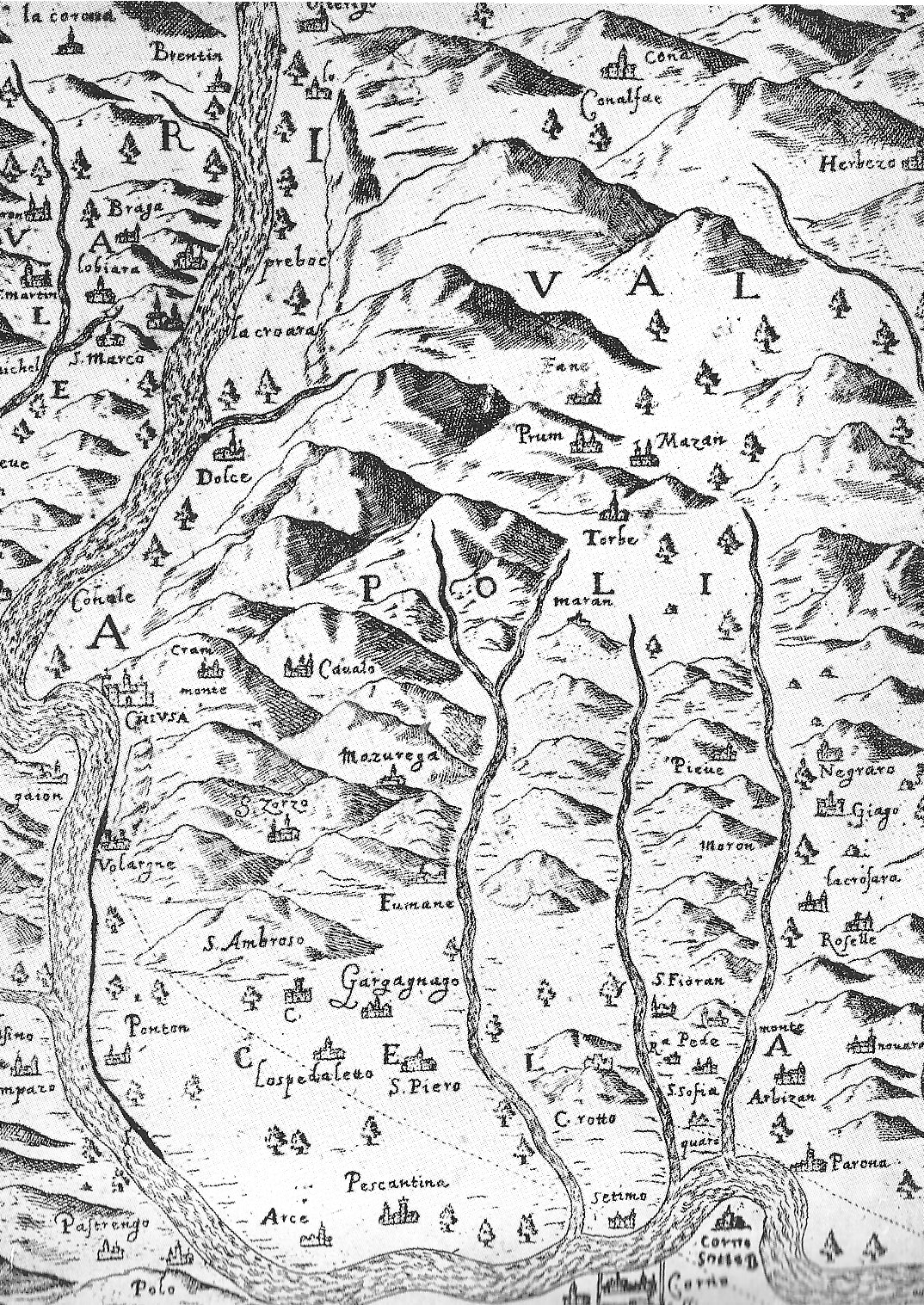
Map from 1625 depicting Valpolicella, made by Giovanni Nacchio.

With Antonio della Scala the seigniory of the Scaligeri fell, and on October 20, 1388, the Visconti rule of Gian Galeazzo Visconti began, during which the Valpolicella became a Colonel again; however, it was granted some tax concessions and partial independence of government. With the death of Gian Galeazzo (1402) the Visconti seigniory in Verona also fell, and power briefly passed to Francesco da Carrara. Taking advantage of the discontent of the Veronese with the new lord and the continuing unrest in the city, the army of the Venetian Republic, aided in part by the people, entered Verona and put the Carraresi to flight.

With the passage under Venetian rule, followed by the devotion of Verona to Venice on June 24, 1405, Valpolicella became a vicariate. A golden bull issued on July 16, 1405 confirmed the previous boundaries and all the rights already acquired to which new ones were added, including the right to be able to appoint its own vicar independently. However, several years had to pass before a stable arrangement was reached, which was necessary to overcome some of the ancient feudal customs that were still observed. The first vicar who ruled over Valpolicella is believed to have been Francesco Brognolino, elected for the year 1414, but there is certainty of names only from 1420 onward with vicar Ruffino Campagna.

Among the other vicariates into which the Veronese territory was divided, the Valpolicella vicariate was the one that enjoyed throughout its history greater autonomy and a better economic and social environment. Also in terms of territorial extension, the Valpolicella vicariate excelled among the others although the exact boundaries, which were the subject of continuous disputes with the Habsburgs of Austria, were established with exactitude only in the middle of the 18th century, when the Treaty on the Differences of Boundaries was signed by Francesco Morosini for the Republic and by Paride Wolkenstein for Austria; the document was then published in Rovereto on September 5, 1753. More than 100 boundary markers were placed to indicate the border to the north; it began on the left bank of the Adige north of Ossenigo and then climbed to Corno d'Aquilio and arrived at Dosso Sparvieri on the Lessinian plateau after crossing Passo delle Fittanze, Castelberto, and Podesteria.

=== The four centuries under the Serenissima ===
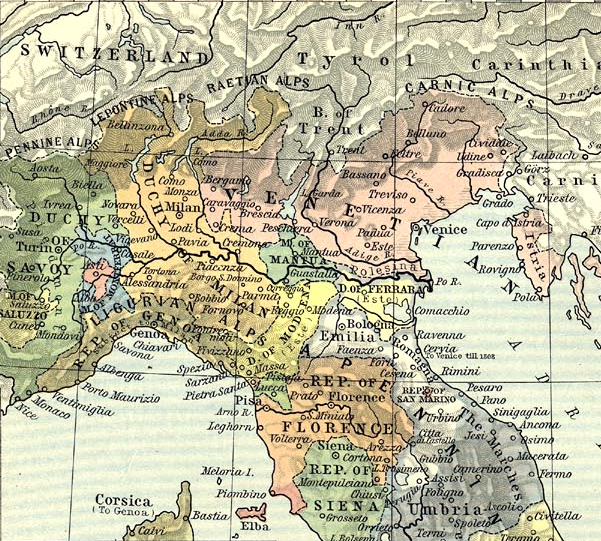
Northern Italy in 1494, just before the War of the League of Cambrai.

Throughout the entire span of Venetian rule, Valpolicella went through a period of particular splendor, evidenced also by the numerous Venetian villas that were built as country residences for the wealthy Veronese patrician families, who went there on holiday or to follow their landed estates.

Despite being a border territory, in those four centuries Valpolicella was never the scene of bloody war events, apart from rare exceptions. In 1509, in the context of the War of the League of Cambrai, Emperor Maximilian I of Habsburg crossed the Valpolicella with his troops on his way to conquer Verona, but without causing any particular problems. In contrast, seven years later, the same troops retreating northward indulged in looting and violence.

The religious wars of the 16th-17th centuries, such as the Thirty Years' War, did not directly involve Valpolicella, but the population had to cope with the catastrophic epidemics brought by the soldiers and fostered by the poor sanitary conditions that afflicted the poorer classes. Malnutrition facilitated the spread among the peasants of diseases such as pellagra, which only the introduction of corn into agriculture could stem. As in most of Europe, the plague of 1630 also raged in Valpolicella, killing about two-thirds of the entire population.

Although Venice had declared itself neutral, the War of the Spanish Succession brought harsh battles to its territory. While the population was not particularly harmed, Valpolicella was the protagonist of an important military operation: in 1701 Prince Eugene of Savoy, in an attempt to outflank the French troops commanded by Nicolas Catinat, barricaded on the slopes of Mount Baldo to bar their way south, led his army from Ala to the heights of the Lessini Mountains, reaching Verona on June 5 via the roads of Valpolicella.

=== The demise of the Vicariate ===
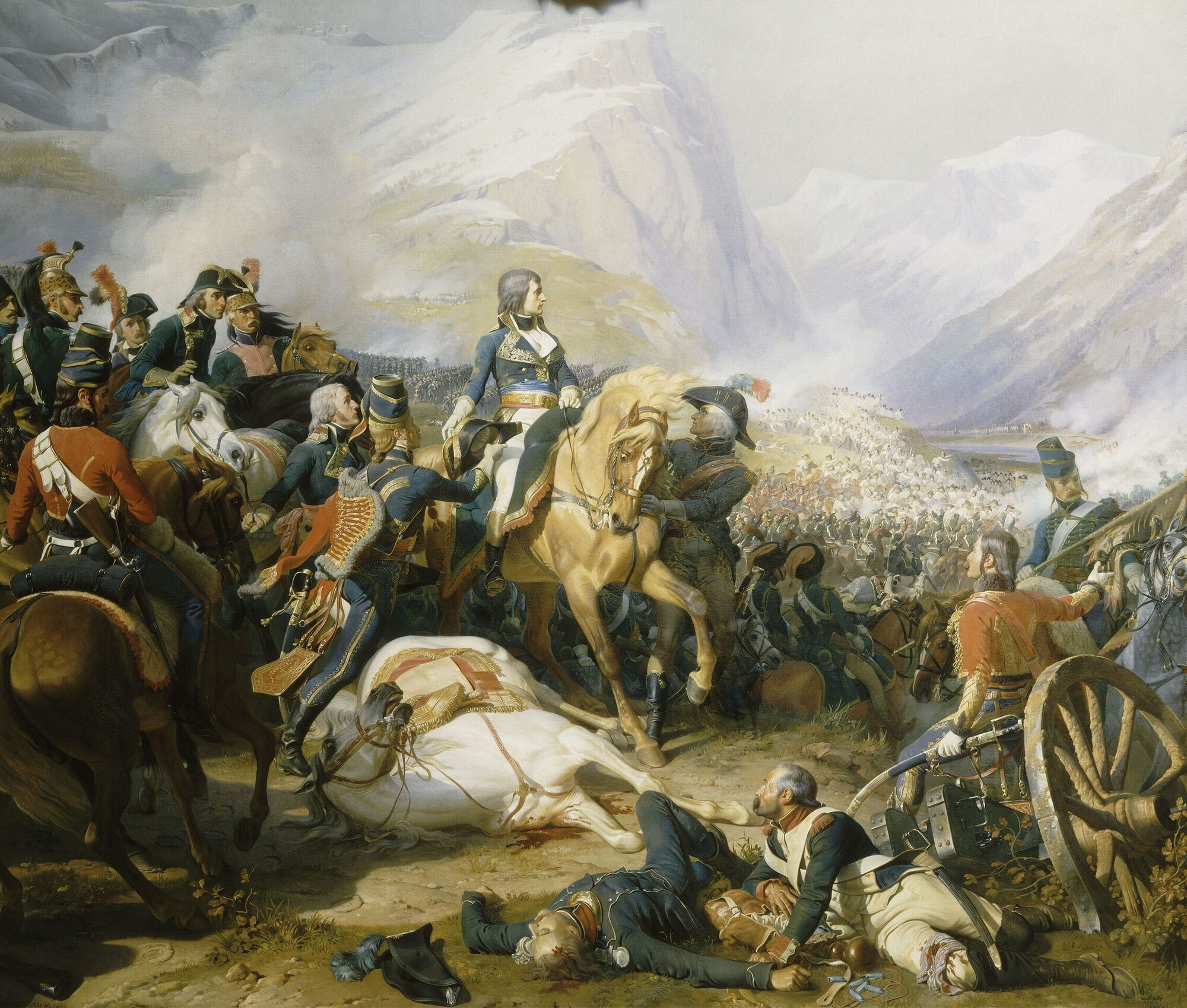
The Battle of Rivoli, following which the French became rulers of northern Italy.

In 1796, during the first Italian campaign, Napoleon's armies conquered Verona, placing Valpolicella under their rule as well. Although the French provisional government wanted to appear as a promoter of freedom and continuity, the reality proved to be quite different, condemning the Venetian institutions to set off toward an inexorable decline. On April 17, 1797, there was a rebellion, which went down in history as the "Veronese Easter," in which many Valpolicella nobles and commoners took part. After a few days the revolt was suppressed in blood; the village of Pescantina alone saw the killing of as many as eighteen of its inhabitants who had tried to defend their boats from French soldiers who wanted to take possession of them.

With the Treaty of Campo Formio of 1797, which decreed the demise of the Venetian Republic, the centuries-old Vicariate of Valpolicella was also suppressed, however briefly reestablished following the subsequent cession of Veneto to the Austrians. The latter took steps to ensure that "the Laws in force at the time of January 1, 1796, concerning the good government and economy of the communes..." were fully executed.

With the Peace of Pressburg of December 26, 1805, which for the territories located to the left of the Adige came into force only from May 1 of the following year, Veneto once again came under the control of the French, who permanently abrogated all vicariates. Thus, the Vicariate of Valpolicella also disappeared forever, as did the privileges and autonomy the valley had enjoyed for over four centuries.

== Bodies and institutions ==
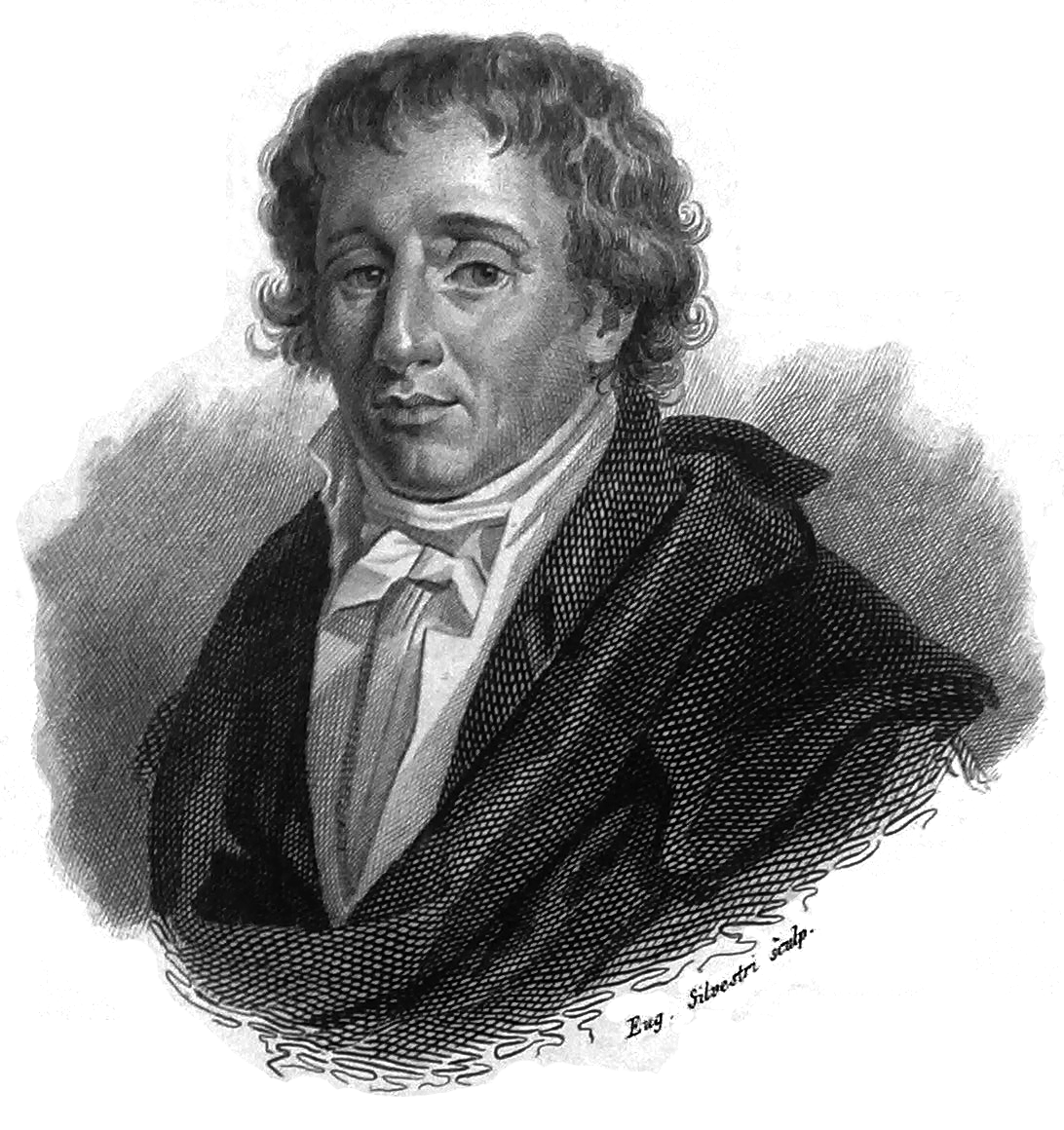
Ippolito Pindemonte, one of the last vicars of Valpolicella.

Vicar
He was the highest authority in Valpolicella. He held office for one year and was elected through a ballot held just before Christmas at the headquarters in San Pietro in Cariano. The appointment was proposed by the auditor, the Council of Eighteen, all the Bailiffs of the Valley and the incumbent vicar who had the privilege of being able to vote twice. The office was to be held by noble citizens of Verona, often belonging to lineages with estates or interests in the Valley.

Once elected, he would go by January accompanied by the Auditor and six councilors to the Podestà of Verona to take an oath "of loyalty and obedience to Venice, to administer justice fairly, and to observe the 'Orders and Privileges of the Valley.'" He then took office on the second day of February, after a sumptuous and particularly organized ceremony: the newly elected man's court departed from Verona's Porta San Giorgio and then proceeded to the seat of San Pietro in Cariano, where the resigning vicar handed him the baton of command and the valley insignia. Then, everyone went to the church of Santa Maria in Ospedaletto di Pescantina to attend the religious ceremony of inauguration followed by a sumptuous banquet. Finally, the procession would return to Verona through Porta San Zeno.

His duties were manifold: twice a week he decided both civil and criminal cases, up to the second instance; he controlled stocks and prices of goods; he presided over the Council of Eighteen; he coordinated administrative activities; and he carried out estimi. He was required to report to his office every Tuesday and Friday, but there were vacations and periods when he was off work, such as during the grape harvest. For his services he was remunerated with fifty ducats, while for each survey he received a gazeta.

Notaries
They contributed to the administration of justice with secretarial functions. There was one dedicated to civil cases, called the Nodaro del civile, and one known as the Nodaro del quasi maleficio for criminal ones. They were in charge, therefore, of recording the charges, lawsuits, complaints and sentences issued by the vicar. The second also followed cases for damages due to damaged roads and the division of pledges. The two notaries accompanied the vicar when he moved for the exactions, one for half of the communes and the other for the other half.

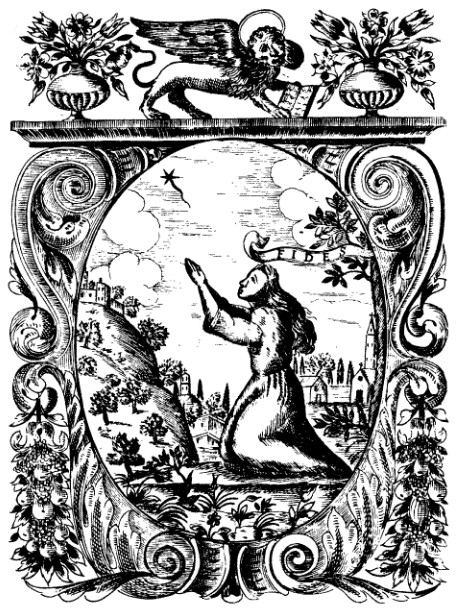
Cover of Ordini, e Consuetudini, che si osservano nell'Offitio del Vicariato della Valpolicella, where all the offices established in the Vicariate are described.

Auditor
To hold this office it was necessary to have at least three years' experience in the Valley Council, to be older than 30 years of age and to be a "discreet, prudent man of sufficient experience in things and of good standing and reputation." He was elected by the same voters as the vicar and on the same day, but held office for three years with the possibility of reelection. He represented and defended the interests of Valpolicella, and to carry out this task to the best of his ability he was required, under penalty of sanctions, to "keep a horse for all the occurrences of the valley," often having to travel to Verona to the Territorial Office. His compensation was fixed by the vicar.

Tax collector
He was to be chosen from among people of "excellent condition and reputation" and was appointed at the same time as the vicar. He collected fees and taxes, as well as made payments on behalf of the council or the vicar.

Deputy of the accounts
He was elected in the same manner as the collector. He drew up budgets and kept accounts for those who requested them.

Four officers
They were in charge of many duties, including overseeing the pawn office. They were obliged to reside in Valpolicella and before taking office had to swear allegiance to the vicar or notary.

Council of Eighteen
They were elected on the first day of September by all the authorities, who were precluded from voting their own relatives. Six of them took office each year, who, after being sworn in on the Bible, would serve for three years. Their main function was to assist the vicar in governing the valley. For each valley council meeting they attended they were rewarded with three troni.

Pawnbroker
The appointment came from the vicar and later placed for approval by the Council of Eighteen. The appointment was annual and consisted of running a kind of mount of piety.

== Privileges ==
Ever since the county was established in the Scaliger era, the people of Valpolicella could count on certain privileges, later confirmed and extended during the Vicariate era under the Serenissima. This favorable situation can be explained by the fact that the valley was a borderland and therefore it was necessary for the Venetian government to secure the loyalty of the inhabitants for the custody of strategic areas, such as the Ceraino Sluice or the mountain passes on the border with Trentino. A loyalty that never diminished throughout the vicariate's history, so much so that during the Venetian-Viscontean war of 1439 the vicar Jacopo da Marano showed "incorrupt fidelity and unswerving loyalty."

Among the most important privileges were reduced duties on wine and livestock, ease in importing salt, and exemption from some taxes. One of the most important privileges was to be able to elect their own vicar independently, unlike in other vicariates where it was imposed by the government of Verona. In addition, the vicar and the Council of Eighteen answered directly to the Venetian rectors and not to those of Verona. The Vicariate of Valpolicella was exempt from providing troops, although it had the obligation to accommodate those in transit and to pay any war tributes as well as to contribute to the fortifications of the city of Verona. Being a border area, to discourage smuggling, the inhabitants of Valpolicella were exempt from taxes on wool. Although the Adige River flowed through the entire southern border of the valley, the Vicariate of Valpolicella was not required to take care of embankment repairs beyond a mere 120 perches.

== Economy ==
The economy of the Valpolicella Vicariate was predominantly rural, with agriculture as the predominant activity. As a rule, fields were entrusted to local laborers through a form of contract called a “level concession” lasting 10 years that could be renewed, or for a fixed period of 29 years. Under this contract, the landowner had the right to collect rents both in kind and in money from the tenant. To these, called laboratores (laborers), although they were free in the conduct of the land, what remained was at the limit of their subsistence. In later times the contract of “lavorenzia” was introduced, which involved the establishment of a partnership between the landowner and the laborer: the peasant contributed his labor and that of his family to the enterprise, and the other party provided him with the land, the stable and the dwelling. The owner, then, benefited from a large share of the produce as well as from having the worker available for further tasks. Toward the end of the Vicariate's history, the “metayage” contract was introduced. In some areas, particularly hilly ones, short-term partial contracts were more common. In addition to laboratores there were also bracenti (farmhands) paid on a daily basis and smallholder farmers called boari.

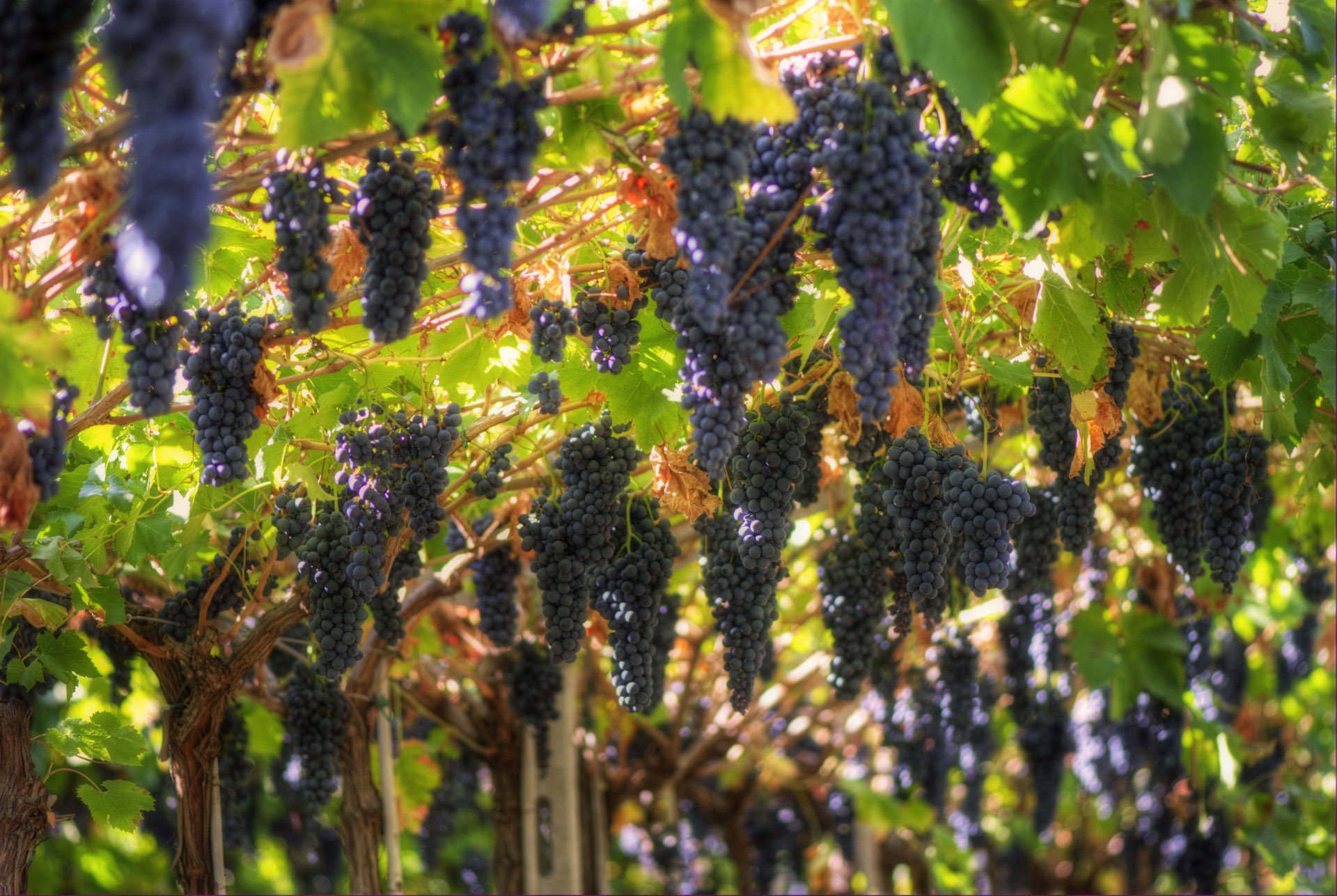
Bunches of grapes in a Valpolicella vineyard. Since Roman times, the wines produced there enjoyed high regard. This tradition continued into the Vicariate era when agricultural activities were central to the economy.

Despite some crises that cyclically affected the area, there was a steady development of agrarian activity between the 16th and 17th centuries, which continued to be an excellent source of income for large landowners. Mainly, interest was centered toward the cultivation of cereals and grapes, especially in the lowland and early hill areas, while animal husbandry and pastoralism were more common in mountainous locations or in the higher hills. In the mid-15th century, owing to the impetus given by the Venetians, the wool production activity was supplanted by the cultivation of mulberry trees for the breeding of silkworms, a choice that proved very profitable. The government of the Serenissima also introduced the cultivation of corn and, starting in the 17th century, beans and potatoes. Of lesser, but still significant, importance was the presence of orchards, especially apples and peaches. Considerable space was also to be occupied by grapevines, present in Valpolicella since prehistoric times; in Castelrotto grape seeds belonging to vitis vinifera have been found near vestiges of ancient dwellings dating back to the Iron Age. As the centuries passed, Valpolicella's suitability for wine production would become increasingly relevant.

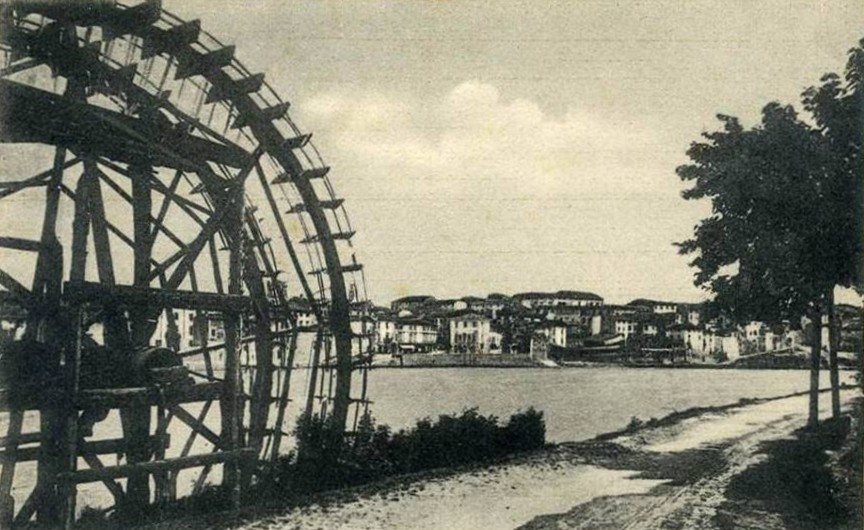
Mill wheel in the Adige River in Pescantina. Numerous mills were built in the Vicariate period, exploiting the torrential waters and the Adige River.

Although agriculture was the main activity, the Vicariate did not lack artisans such as carpenters, butchers, bakers, carters, farriers and embroiderers. The presence of numerous streams of a torrential nature favored the appearance of many mills, particularly in the area north of Fumane and Marano, although the waters of the Adige were also widely used for this purpose, from Ponton to Settimo di Pescantina.

In Sant'Ambrogio and Negrar (the Prun quarries are famous) there were important marble mining activities that had begun since Roman times. Many churches in Verona, Venice and other major cities in Europe were built with these marbles. Iron and manganese mines were opened, though with little success; charcoal was produced in the highlands, while timber, both for construction and firewood, was obtained from the forests.

== Tax system ==
The tax system in use in the Vicariate of Valpolicella was highly complex and often inequitable. Taxes and duties were the “direct taxes,” while the gravezze represented personal taxes and were determined through the estimo. The latter was the tool for determining the tax-paying capacity of each individual taxpayer (allibrato), but due to a wide discretion it was often a source of injustice in favor of the more powerful classes.

Each allibrato in the valley was listed in a register known as the Campione d'Estimo, showing his or her estimo calculated on the average of five stime and excluding the highest and lowest. The result constituted the coefficient through which, by further steps, the exact tribute to be paid was determined.

== Society ==
=== Social life ===
The common people who inhabited the Vicariate around the 15th and 16th centuries lived mainly in poor wooden dwellings with thatched roofs, grouped in rural courts and sometimes protected by a dovecote in which provisions were kept to protect them from frequent banditry. In later centuries, rural courts expanded and buildings began to be made of masonry, while a fence improved security. The most prestigious courts also featured a farmyard with a manor house, a chapel, workers' tenements, storehouses, stables, porches, barn, chicken coop, pigsty, and the increasingly common dovecote. Some courts were so self-contained that they were equipped with a bread oven, a well and a cellar.

Despite the relative wealth of this area, conditions for the peasants remained miserable. The interiors of the houses mostly consisted of a large room used as a living room and kitchen, to which a bedroom was added; people slept on planks resting on trestles, on which straw mattresses were placed. Promiscuity was frequent with all members of the family, which was strictly patriarchal, sharing the same roof. Farm work was hard and food was scarce, with peasants relying almost exclusively on self-production for their subsistence needs. The typical diet consisted of milk in the morning, vegetable soup at lunch, and wheat or, later, cornmeal porridge in the evening. Cheese, cooked vegetables, fruits and sausages were rarely available; wine and bread were a luxury that the poorest people only exceptionally had availability of.

Poor nutrition accompanied by poor hygienic conditions was a fertile ground for poverty-related epidemics and diseases to spread, such as: pellagra, scarlet fever, tuberculosis, scrofula, and diphtheria.

=== Demographic development ===
All demographic data relating to the Serenissima era have come down to us through parish registers. Compared to the rest of the Veronese territory, the population belonging to the Vicariate of Valpolicella experienced greater growth through the years. As an example, in 1358, 5.4 percent of the entire population of Verona lived in the district of San Pietro in Cariano, while by 1795 this figure had risen to 6.7 percent. The most serious demographic crises were those related to the plague epidemics of 1576 and that of 1630, as indeed happened in practically all of Europe. The population of the Valpolicella Vicariate was divided into three piovadeghi, headed by pievi; it is estimated that the one of San Floriano comprised about 52% of the total residents of the Vicariate, the one of Negrar 28%, and the one of San Giorgio the remaining 20%.

Historical population
Year	1538	1577	1616	1630	1631	1672	1710	1744	1770	1790	1795
Pop.	7,868	7,200	8,982	11,769	4,906	9,720	10,938	14,266	15,147	15,419	17,251
±%	—	−8.5%	+24.8%	+31.0%	−58.3%	+98.1%	+12.5%	+30.4%	+6.2%	+1.8%	+11.9%

=== Religious organization ===
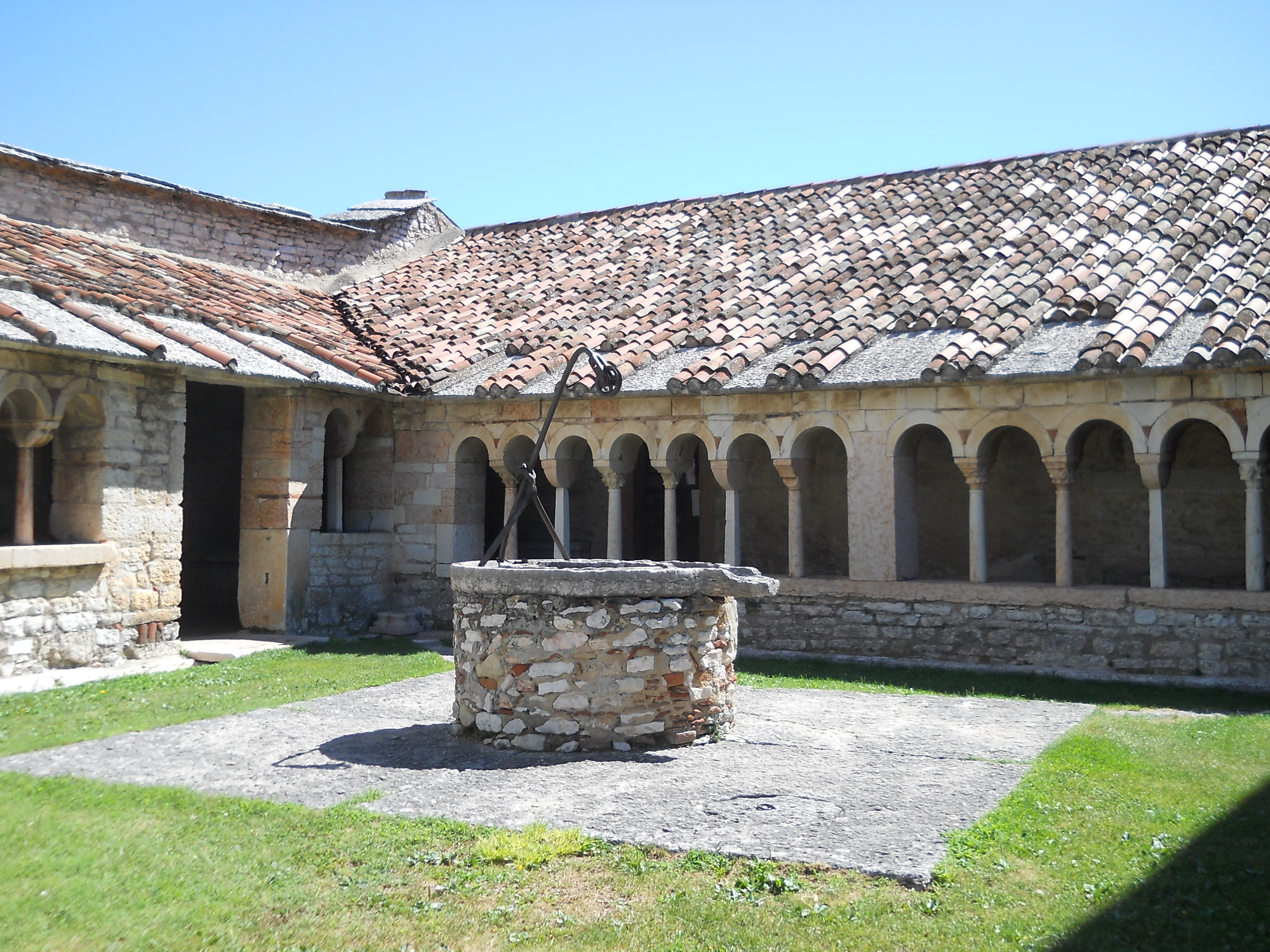
Cloister of the parish church of San Giorgio di Valpolicella, at the head of one of the three piovadeghi into which the territory of the Vicariate was divided.

In terms of ecclesiastical structure, the territory of the Vicariate of Valpolicella followed the division into three piovadeghi corresponding to the three main pievi: those of San Floriano, San Giorgio, and Negrar. The pievi had jurisdiction over the minor churches subject to them and had the right to tithe on the crops coming from the territories under their jurisdiction.

During the 15th century the Veronese church experienced a period of deep moral crisis, with clergy struggling to establish themselves as credible spiritual leaders for the population. Bishops were chosen from among the nobility and held that position more for the prestige that accompanied it than for real vocation. Parish priests also showed no interest in the care of souls, and often did not even reside in the parish assigned to them. There was no regularity in the celebration of masses, the office of the sacraments and catechism. In 1454 Ermolao Barbaro took office as bishop of Verona and, realizing the situation, began a radical transformation of the diocese. The most effective intervention was the institution of periodic pastoral visits to parishes to check the state of the buildings and the clergy present, which ended with suggestions and provisions aimed at improving the conditions found.

This practice was also followed by his successors, and in particular by Gian Matteo Giberti. Appointed bishop in 1528, he carried out an important redevelopment action, not neglecting the parishes of the Valpolicella Vicariate. Giberti's numerous visits to the valley highlighted how, despite the many religious buildings present there, the few active priests were unable to meet the spiritual needs of the population. The minutes drawn up on the occasion of Barbaro and Giberti's visits are a valuable source for learning about Valpolicella's ecclesiastical organization and reconstructing the history of the various buildings used for worship.

== The Domus Valli Pulicelle ==
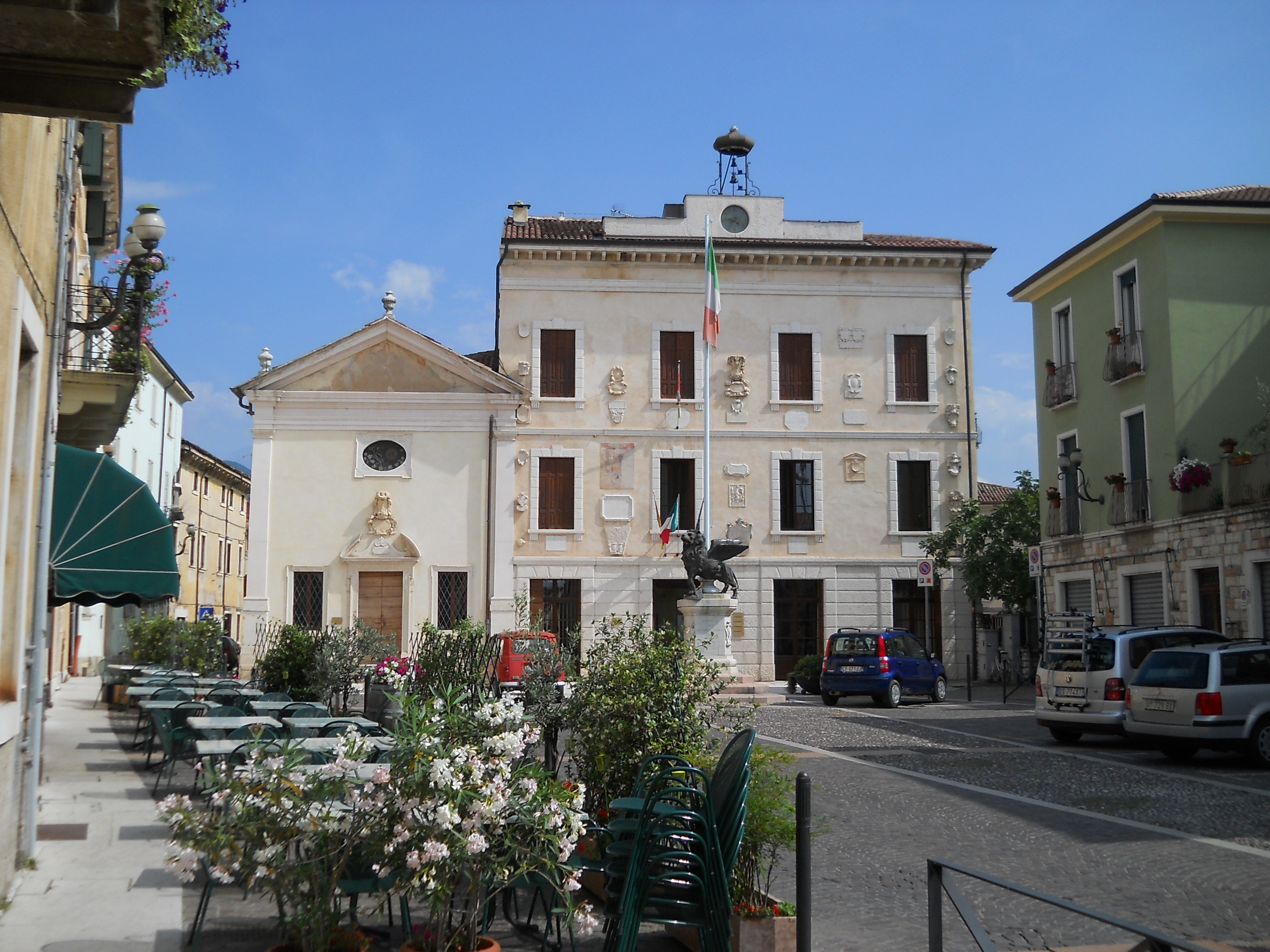
Ara della Valle Square in San Pietro in Cariano. The building on the right was the former seat of the Vicariate (note the coats of arms and epigraphs on the facade). On the left is the church of St. Clare of Assisi.

In the early years of the vicariate's existence, its seat was not precisely defined. However, at least from 1452, when the office of vicar was held by Agostino Guarino, it was established in San Pietro in Cariano in what is now Ara della Valle Square. The building that housed it was built in the 14th century; originally this consisted of a loggia, a large hall and an inner courtyard, and stood on two floors. No less than thirty coats of arms and epigraphs commemorating the most important vicars can be seen on the facade, accompanied by a fresco depicting a Madonna and Child.

All administrative, fiscal and judicial activities concerning its jurisdiction were carried out in this building. It remained the seat of the vicar for four centuries; when the vicariate was abolished it became the seat of the municipality until 1980, when the town hall was moved a short distance away.

Inside are several frescoes, including a Madonna attributed to Francesco Morone and others from the 17th century. A plaque walled in the atrium reads, “...Valpolicella with its 6135 unanimous votes joined the rest of Italy,” which commemorates the Veneto plebiscite of 1866.

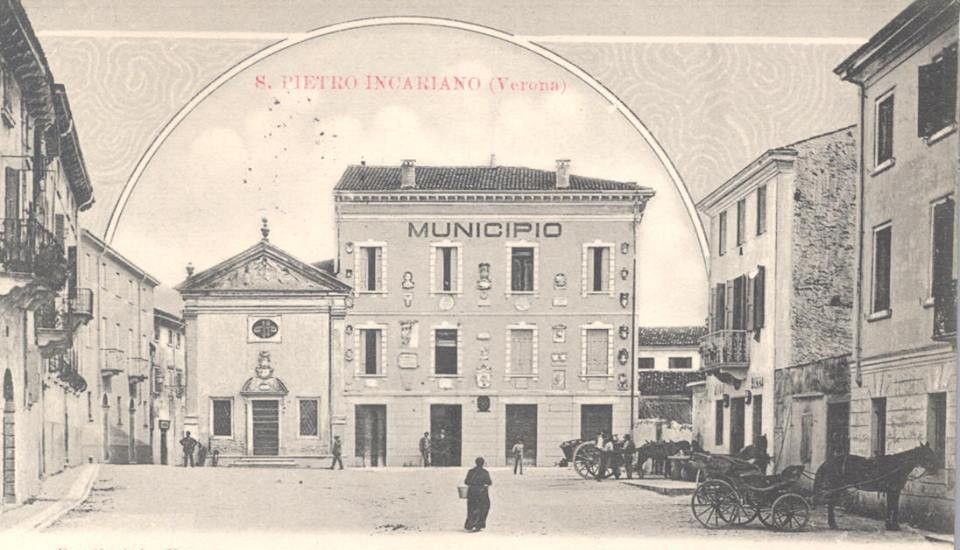
The former seat of the Vicariate as it looked at the end of the 19th century.

Next to the building is a small chapel built between 1682 and 1687. Commonly known as the Church of the Altar, it was actually dedicated in 1692 to St. Clare of Assisi, as shown by a plaque placed by the vicar Carlo de Verità Poeta. The small building was built at the behest of the Valley Council, probably on the remains of a pre-existing medieval building. Religious services were held there for the pawnbrokers and auditors who met on Sundays after Mass. On the exterior is a fresco attributed to Giovanni Battista Lanceni, while the interior, accessed through a Baroque portal, contains an altarpiece by Alessandro Marchesini depicting St. Clare Protecting Valpolicella.

Tradition has it that next to the Domus Vallis, precisely to its left, were the prisons, consistent with the fact that the vicar was also entrusted with the task of administering justice and passing sentences. However, it is more likely that the cells were located within the Domus itself.

== See also ==
- History of Verona
- Valpolicella

== Bibliography ==
- Ordini, e Consuetudini, che si osservano nell'Offitio del Vicariato della Valpolicella. Verona. 1731.
- Bresaola, Francesco (1971). Negrar. Edizioni Contardi.
- Franco Carcereri (1983). "L'amministrazione della Valpolicella attraverso documenti a stampa di epoca veneta" (pdf). Annuario della Valpolicella. I. Centro di documentazione per la storia della Valpolicella.
- Dal Negro, Rinaldo (2003). Contea e vicariato della Valpolicella. Banco popolare di Verona e Novara.
- Federico Del Tredici, ed. (2021). La signoria rurale nell’Italia del tardo medioevo, 5. Censimento e quadri regionali (PDF). Roma: Universitalia.
- Silvestri, Giuseppe (1950). La Valpolicella. Centro di documentazione per la storia della Valpolicella.
- Solinas, Giovanni (1981). Storia di Verona. Verona: Centro Rinascita.
- Varanini, Gian Maria (1987). La Valpolicella nella prima età moderna (1500 c.-1630). Verona: Centro di documentazione per la storia della Valpolicella.
