= Sant'Ambrogio di Valpolicella =

Sant'Ambrogio di Valpolicella Sant’Anbroxio
- Comune
- Comune di Sant'Ambrogio di Valpolicella
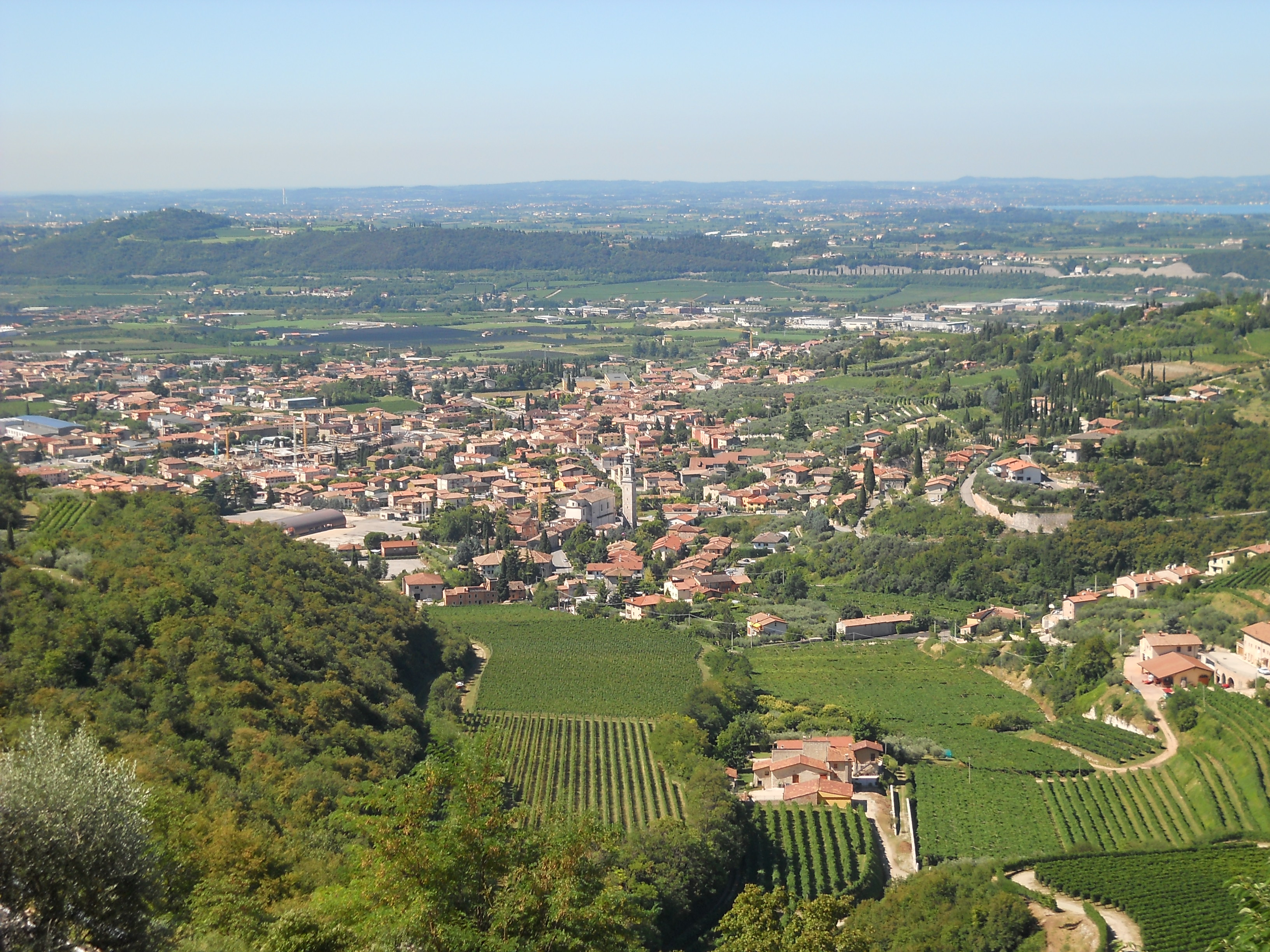

- Coat of arms

- Location within Italy Location within Veneto
- Coordinates: 45°31′N 10°50′E
- Country: Italy
- Region: Veneto
- Province: Verona (VR)
- Frazioni: Domegliara, Ponton, Monte, San Giorgio, Gargagnago

Government
  - Mayor: Roberto Zorzi

Area
  - Total: 23.5 km^{2} (9.1 sq mi)
- Elevation: 174 m (571 ft)

Population (1 August 2014)
  - Total: 11,700
  - Density: 498/km^{2} (1,290/sq mi)
- Demonym: Ambrosiani
- Time zone: UTC+1 (CET)
  - Summer (DST): UTC+2 (CEST)
- Postal code: 37015
- Dialing code: 045
- Website: Official website

Sant'Ambrogio di Valpolicella (Venetian: Sant’Anbroxio) is a comune (municipality) in the Province of Verona in the Italian region Veneto, located about 120 kilometres (75 miles) west of Venice and about 15 km (9 mi) northwest of Verona.

Sant'Ambrogio di Valpolicella borders the following municipalities: Cavaion Veronese, Dolcè, Fumane, Pastrengo, Pescantina, Rivoli Veronese, and San Pietro in Cariano. Its frazione of San Giorgio is one of I Borghi più belli d'Italia ("The most beautiful villages of Italy").

Sights include the Romanesque pieve of San Giorgio, built in the 12th century over a Lombard (and perhaps pre-Roman) religious place. The interior has a nave and two aisles, of the same height, divided by piers. Some of the latter are decorated by 14th-century paintings. The basements of the columns are re-used Roman altars. The church houses also 11th-century frescoes, including a Last Supper; also notable is the ciborium, built during the reign of the Lombard king Liutprand (711-744). The bell tower and the cloister are also from the 12th century.

== Twinning ==
Sant'Ambrogio is twinned with:

- Oppenheim, Germany
- (Italy) Sant'Ambrogio di Torino, since 2004
- (Italy) Sant'Ambrogio sul Garigliano, since 2004
- Sežana, Slovenia

== See also ==
- Parish Church of San Giorgio di Valpolicella
