= Parish Church of San Giorgio di Valpolicella =

Church in Veneto, Italy

- Pieve di San Giorgio di Valpolicella
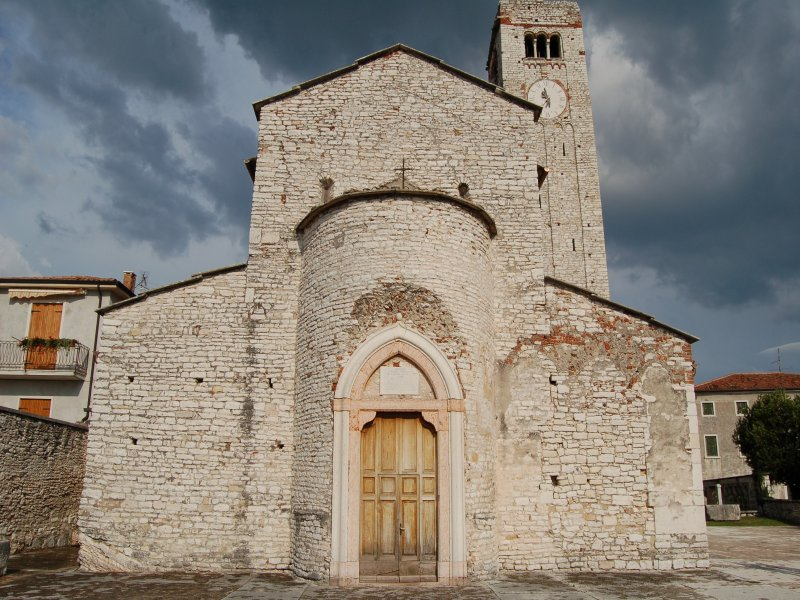
- View of the western facade

- 45.535278°N 10.85°E
- Location: Sant'Ambrogio di Valpolicella, Veneto, Italy
- Denomination: Catholic

History
- Dedication: Saint George

Architecture
- Style: Lombard and Romanesque
- Groundbreaking: 7th - 8th century
- Completed: 11th century

Administration
- Diocese: Roman Catholic Diocese of Verona

The parish church of San Giorgio di Valpolicella, also known as the parish church of San Giorgio Ingannapoltron, (Note: The name "Ingannapoltron," which probably arose from the 15th century onward, derives from the long climb required to reach the village and its location in an area rich in quarries, called ganna. In Bolla, p. 15.) is an ancient Catholic place of worship located in San Giorgio di Valpolicella, a hamlet of Sant'Ambrogio di Valpolicella, in the province and diocese of Verona; it is also the seat of the parish of the same name included in the vicariate of Valpolicella.

Probably built on a site previously used for pagan worship dating back to the 8th century (according to some historians perhaps as far back as the 7th), the present religious building represents one of the most interesting and ancient examples of Romanesque architecture found in the province of Verona. (Note: Luigi Simeoni states that it is the oldest church in the Verona area, both because of the presence of a ciborium dated 712 and because of its early orientation with the facade facing east. In Simeoni, p. 381)

Largely rebuilt around the 11th century, the parish church of San Giorgio was at the head of one of the three "piovadeghi" into which Valpolicella was administratively divided; along with it, the parish churches of San Floriano and Negrar also held this role. (Note: There was also a parish in Arbizzano but it did not play such an important role as to have its own piovadego.) It was also a collegiate church, the seat of a chapter of canons who also ran a schola iuniorum (i.e., a school in which the first notions of Latin grammar were taught to local boys, from among whom new clerics were often chosen).

In addition to the interesting architectural structure, the adjacent cloister and the frescoes inside, of great value is an ancient ciborium that has inscriptions placing it in the middle of the Lombard era, specifically in the period of Liutprand's reign.

== History ==
=== Early traces of settlements ===
Archaeological excavations, carried out on St. George's Hill between 1985 and 1989, have uncovered finds that attest to the presence of human settlements since ancient times. In particular, in addition to a rectangular hut belonging to the Bronze Age, other later structures dating back to the 4th century B.C. were found; all these buildings are in the shape of a "Rhaetian house," typical of the Alpine and subalpine territories. The inhabitants of this village practiced essentially agriculture and animal husbandry and are considered the ancestors of the Arusnates, a population that would settle in Valpolicella during the Roman period.

On display in the cloister are a number of finds from the Roman period, dating from between the 1st century B.C. and the 1st century A.D., such as a sarcophagus consisting of a monolith made of red Verona marble, a well, column remains, and a capital decorated with plant friezes and other unidentifiable ashlars. Smaller artifacts, such as votive offerings to pagan gods, stelae, terracotta figurines, and Roman inscriptions, are kept in the small museum attached to the church or in the Maffeian lapidary in Verona. These artifacts, being mostly dedicated to deities such as Fortuna, Vesta, Sol and Luna, testify to the importance that San Giorgio had, as a place of worship, since the time of the Arusnates. A fragment of a plaque bearing the inscription "LVALDE," the name of the goddess Lualda, which would recall that of the deity Lua, associated, in the Roman pantheon, with Saturn and regarded as the protector of agriculture, has been walled up on the back of the church.

=== Lombard place of worship ===
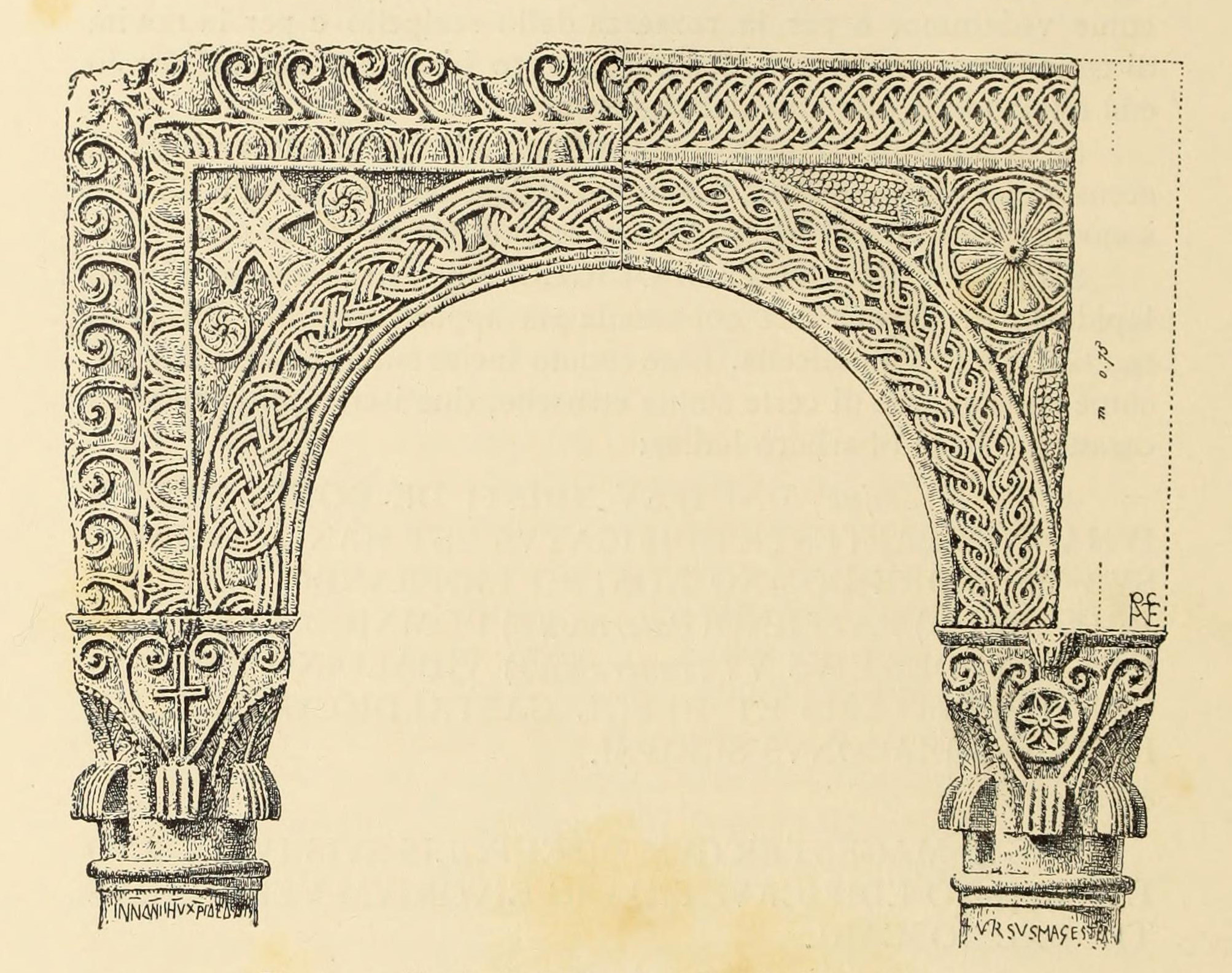
Relief of the ciborium carried out by Raffaele Cattaneo

Although characterized by modest settlements (the few artifacts found attest to this), in the Middle Ages the area of San Giorgio was certainly an important religious center. At that time it was elevated, in fact, to the rank of "parish church," thus obtaining various prerogatives such as the right to baptize, train clerics, and collect tithes.

The current eastward orientation of the facade and especially the inscriptions on the two small columns of the ciborium, preserved inside the church, suggest that the Catholic building arose on a pre-existing place of worship built in the Lombard age. In fact, the construction of these is dated to the reign of Liutprand (712-744), although some historians place its foundation in the 7th century. In the latter case, it could be assumed that San Giorgio was a pagan place of worship, since the Lombards converted to Christianity only toward the end of the 7th century. (Note: The entire populace became, at least nominally, Catholic by the end of the reign of Cunipert (who died in 700), and his successors (above all, Liutprand) consciously leveraged the religious (Catholic) unity of Lombards and Romanics to reassert their role as rex totius Italiae. In Rovagnati, p. 64.)

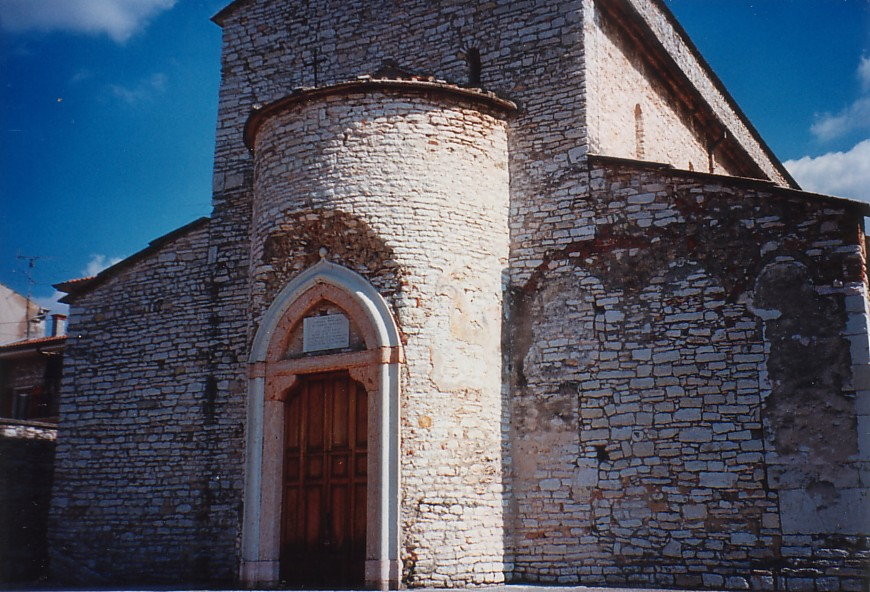
Western facade of the church, probably dating from the Lombard period

As evidence of the Lombard period, in addition to the already mentioned ciborium, it is assumed that the facade wall also remains. Analysis of the latter has suggested that at that time the plan of the building must have had an almost square shape facing east. (Note: These findings were made by Alessandro Da Lisca during his restoration. In Silvestri, p. 92.)

In addition to the sacellum, there was a Lombard castle in San Giorgio, placed at the head of a sculdasia, i.e. a minor district within the duchies, which had extensive administrative, military and jurisdictional powers.

=== The Christian church in the early Middle Ages ===
The earliest evidence of San Giorgio as a Christian building dates back to the 12th century, and more specifically, there is a trace of it in a papal bull of Pope Eugene III dated 1145. However, it is very likely that already following the earthquake of 1117 it may have undergone work and restoration that led to its transformation from a pagan building to a Christian place of worship in the Romanesque style. The characteristic plan with three apses is also similar to other Italian places of worship that arose between the 10th and 12th centuries.

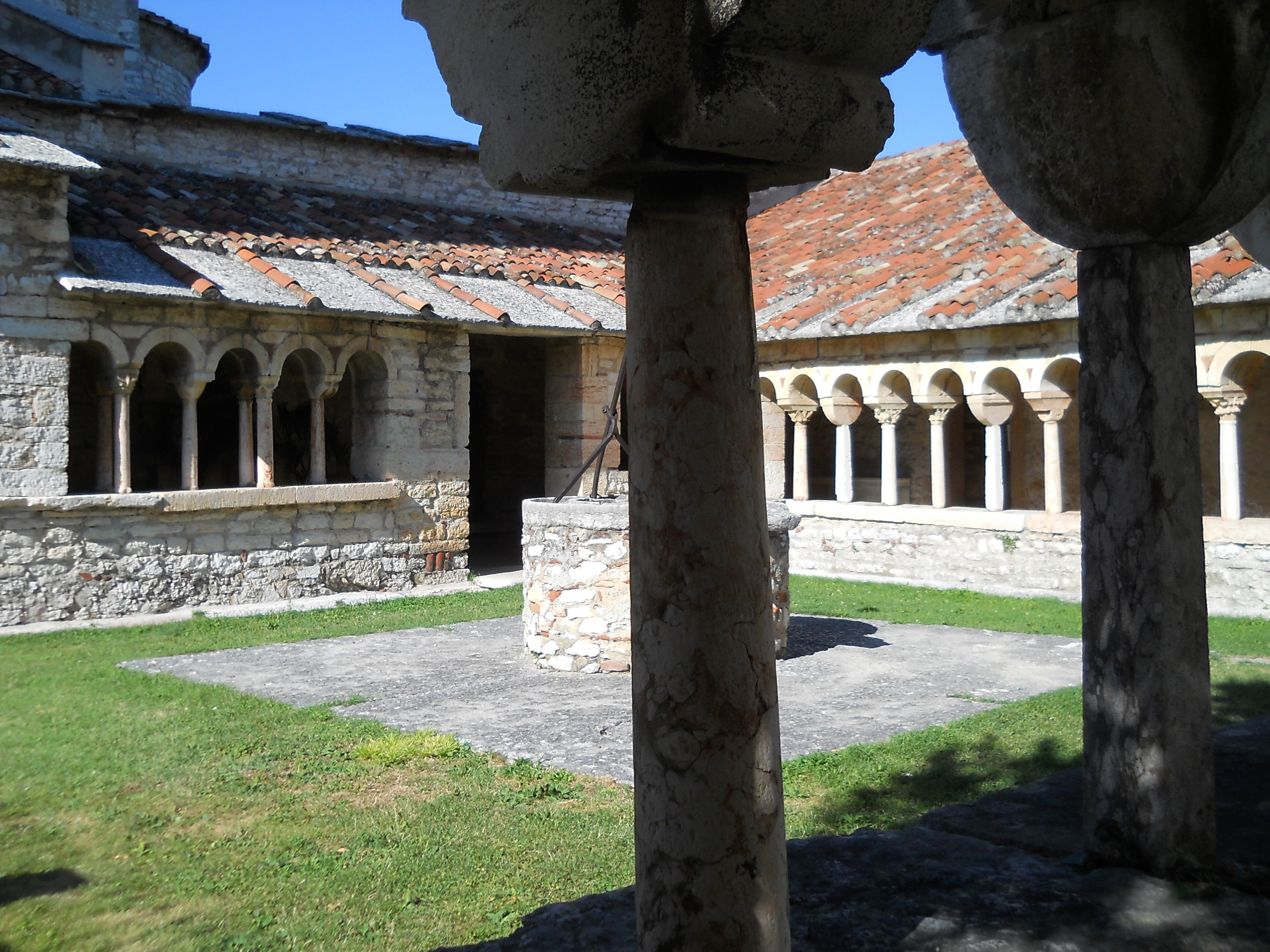
The colonnade of the cloister, dating back to the Christian period

One legend has it that the parish church of San Giorgio, along with those of San Martino in Negrar and San Floriano, was commissioned by Queen Matilda Cristina Malaspina in 1101, but there is no historical evidence to support this thesis.

From the earliest years after the construction of the present building, the parish church of San Giorgio was the seat of a parish to which a collegiate of priests was attached, as evidenced by the small rectory present. These had opened there a schola iuniorum for the early education of boys. Pope Eugene III, in the aforementioned papal bull, records, "Plebem S. Georgii cum capellis et decimis et familiis et dimidia curte."

The baptismal font, located on the left side of the building, dates back to the early 12th century. The church frescoes, worn by time, are of later date and can be dated to the end of the same century. The bell tower is more recent, perhaps built on the basis of an existing one.

Between the 15th and 16th centuries the old apse present along the western elevation was pierced, where a new entrance portal with a pointed arch was opened.

Throughout the late Middle Ages the church of San Giorgio was at the head of one of the piovadeghi into which the Valpolicella was divided. Each of these wards orbited around a parish that represented its center. Of slightly later date than San Giorgio are the parish of San Floriano and the parish of Negrar.

=== Studies and restorations ===
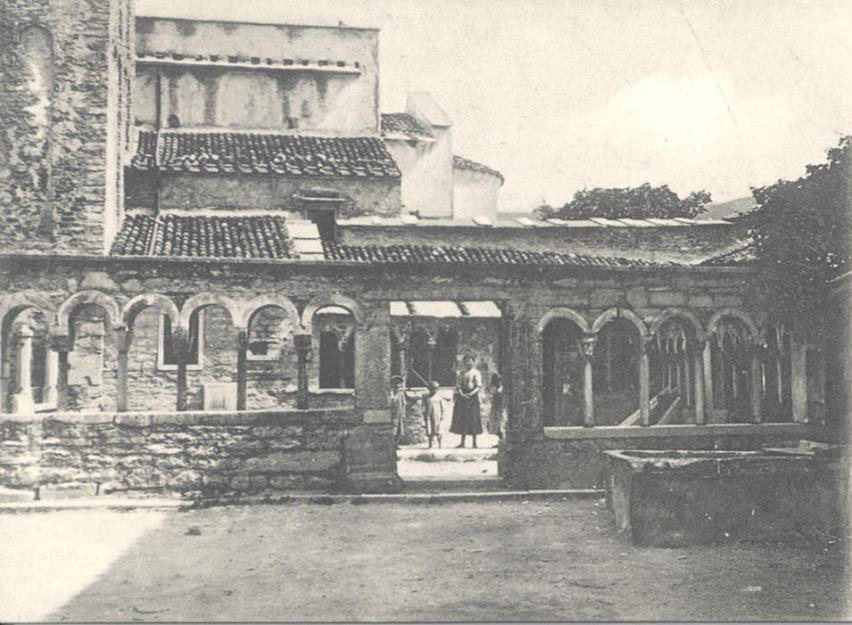
The cloister of the parish church in a historical photograph

The parish church of San Giorgio has aroused interest in scholars since the seventeenth century, (Note: The small column with the inscription naming Liutprand is already mentioned in some writings of scholars of this century.) and particularly in Scipione Maffei, who took the two columns of the ciborium and some Roman inscriptions to enrich his Veronese lapidary museum.

In the nineteenth century numerous accurate studies about the plan of San Giorgio were undertaken by Girolamo Orti Manara; he had, among other things, the merit of finding the ciborium column bearing the inscription "In nomine Domini...".

Between 1923 and 1924, the parish church underwent restorations by architect Alessandro Da Lisca. These works led, in addition to the reconstruction of the ciborium, to the rebuilding of the roof and the modification of some of the windows on the walls. In the 1960s, additional stone artifacts dating back to Roman times were unearthed near the rectory.

Between 1985 and 1994 some archaeological excavations were carried out outside the church, near the triapsidal facade: here some gabled dwellings from the Iron Age and a metalworking workshop were found. This provided the opportunity for the construction of a visitor's route and the archaeological museum, designed by architect Libero Cecchini. The same architect designed, between 2006 and 2007, a new stone portal whose opening is by electric automation and which replaced the previous wooden portal on the western facade.

== Description ==
=== Construction stages ===
The numerous investigations carried out on the structure of the parish church have led to several theories regarding the dating of the complex. In particular, the probable mixing of elements of the original Lombard building with those of the more modern Christian building has created a degree of uncertainty in the reconstruction of the building phases that followed one another over the centuries.

According to the expositions of scholar Wart Arslan and historian Pietro Toesca, considering the perfectly equal height of all the interior arches and the uniformity of the perimeter masonry, this building can be thought to derive (like many others that arose in Italy between the 10th century and the 11th century) from the Ottonian and Carolingian biapsidal churches of the 8th and 9th centuries, such as Saint-Riquier Abbey in Normandy, Fulda Abbey, Obermünster Abbey in Regensburg, Worms Cathedral, and many others. This theory was a major contributor to the dating of the Christian parish. (Note: Wart Arslan concludes his exposition with these words, "If our hypothesis is correct the San Giorgio di Valpolicella would thus attest to a reflux, an unlikely point along the valley of the Adige, at the outlet of which is this village, a witness of ancient Italic culture, of a powerful vein of German art; of that art which, in turn, was to receive so much later by the same route. Indeed, even the old cathedral of Brixen had a biabsid plan. And one would not know how to place San Giorgio otherwise than in the 11th century, for all that is echoed in it, for all that it heralds.")

Of a different opinion are the historians Cipolla, Cattaneo, Mothes and Simeoni, who hypothesize two different building phases. Of the former, the part located on the western side of the complex would remain as the only remnant, thus representing a rare example of a Lombard basilica, while the triapsidal eastern part would be considered more recent (between the 9th and 12th centuries). In this case, moreover, it is hypothesized that the church was initially oriented in the opposite direction from today. The building would then extend to the present inner step, where the bell tower would later be built. Later, the church would be expanded with a three-apse facade, and consequently would incorporate the bell tower.

However, it is not possible to determine precisely which part of the building is of Lombard origin and which is of later origin. The use of identical material and rudimentary construction methods make attempts to identify the differences between the two parts complicated. The most visible dissimilarities, however, between the western and eastern areas are two: the substitution of columns for pillars and the elevation of the floor at the beginning of the part with columns. Also important in this regard is the fact that the largest number of Roman tombstones is distributed along the eastern wall of the church.

=== Exterior ===
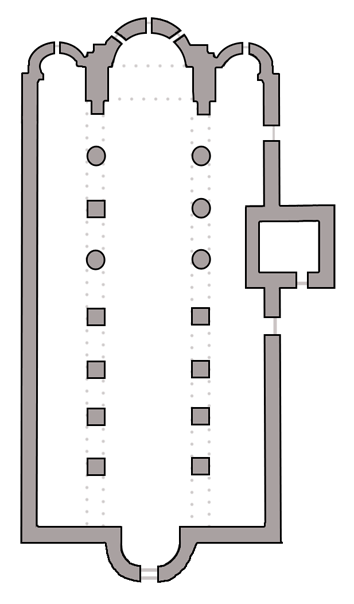
Plan of the church and bell tower

The church has a characteristic plan with the space divided into three naves, with the central one twice as wide as the side naves. The dimensions of the plan show a remarkable balance of the building; in fact, the facade of the church is about half as wide (16 meters) as the two sides (32.5 meters). The eastern side, built probably in the 11th century and in distinct Romanesque style, consists of three apses, a major one in the center and two minor ones on the sides; the central apse has three splayed single lancet windows with round arches, while the two lateral ones have only one, of similar construction, but with small arches made of tuff. The wall consists of white stone ashlars assembled with mortar and arranged horizontally. On the western side, according to some scholars belonging to the original Lombard building, there is an additional apse, where the main entrance door in Gothic style and made of red and white limestone was carved already before 1840. Above the apse, at the nave, two simple single-lancet windows are inserted.

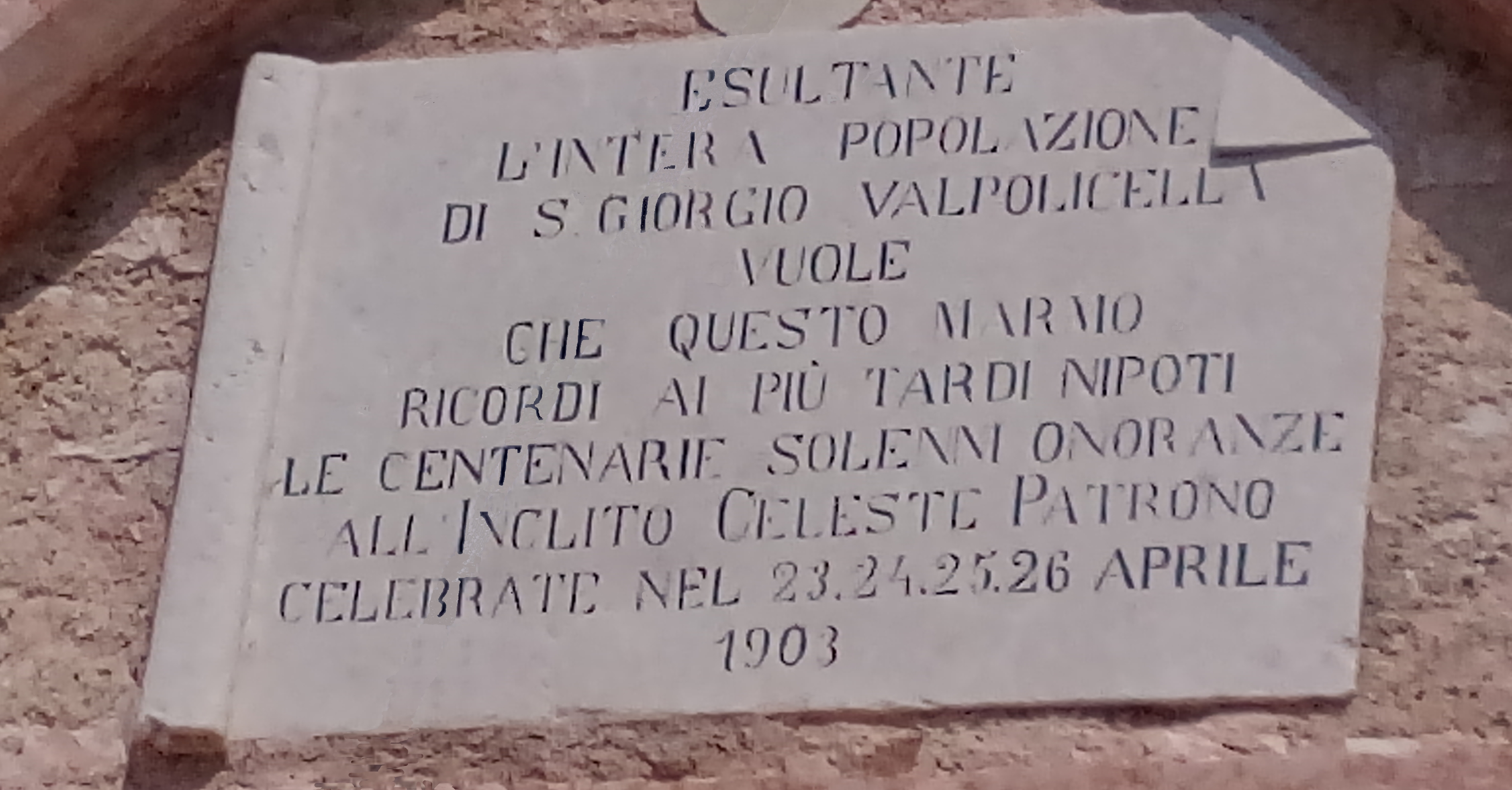
Plaque surmounting the main gate

The main door is surmounted by a plaque bearing the words: "Exultantly, the entire population of S. Giorgio Valpolicella wishes this marble to remind their later grandchildren of the centenary solemn honors to the beloved heavenly patron celebrated on April 23, 24, 25, 26, 1903." The south side wall has two doors (one of which is walled in) that communicate with the parvis, while above these is a series of seven single-lancet windows. On the outside of the same sector, tracing the pure Romanesque style of the building, are the bell tower and a small cloister of which the western perimeter part has been lost. The north side of the church, on the other hand, has no opening.

The roof of the building consists of a row of ten exposed wooden trusses supporting a two-pitch roof covering composed of barrel tiles.

==== Cloister ====
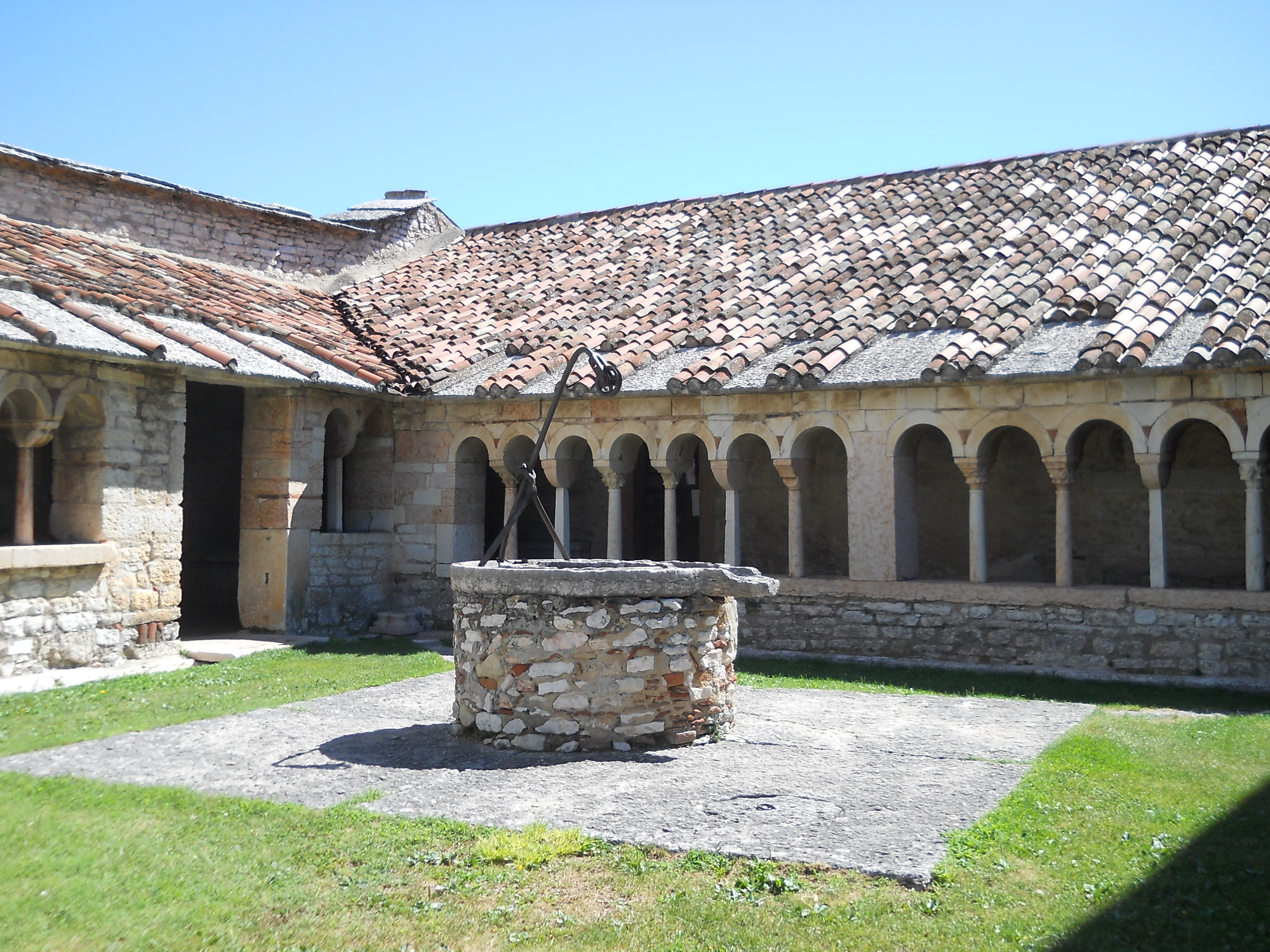
The cloister located along the eastern side of the parish church

The cloister, adjacent to the east side of the church, is dated to the early 12th century, (Note: Not all historians agree with this dating; Orti Manara and Mothes date it to the 10th century, and Simeoni to the 13th century.) and would be contemporary with that of the church of San Giovanni in Valle in Verona. Of the four perimeter sides formed by colonnades, only three remain; in fact, the western side was replaced by a gate in recent times. The colonnades located to the north and east are covered by a roof, formed of barrel tiles and large stone roof tiles. In the center is placed a rustic well.

The semi-circular arches are supported by small columns that rest, in turn, on a continuous wall, discontinuous in height. The masonry has similar construction features to the entire complex. The small columns are adorned with several capitals, in a fair state of preservation, with depictions of animals and flowers.

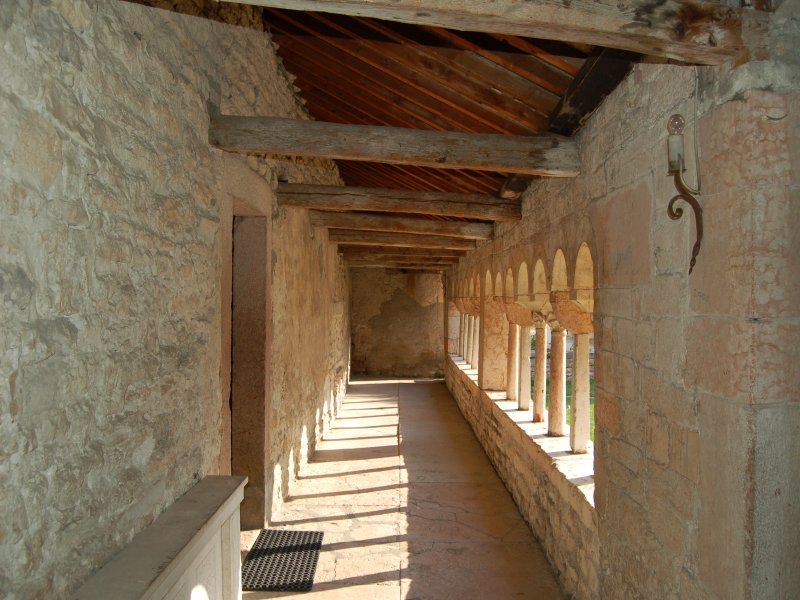
One of the closed sides of the cloister, featuring wooden chains and roofing

The most remarkable perimeter side of the cloister is definitely the one located further east: here the colonnade has fourteen arches divided by a monolithic pillar made of a light-colored, squared stone. The pilasters, built of different materials, are surmounted by capitals without decoration. Unlike the pilasters, the small columns have carved capitals depicting different subjects such as plants, animals, and a human head present only on one of them. Also on this side, in the inner wall of the cloister, some traces of a fresco depicting the features of a lion are preserved.

In the same eastern section, the cloister communicates with the ancient and now abandoned rectory. It is built of limestone, blackened over the years, a material used for much of San Giorgio's ancient architecture. Inside the rectory are some 14th-century frescoes with floral motifs, stars, shields and verses from the Gospel.

==== Bell tower ====
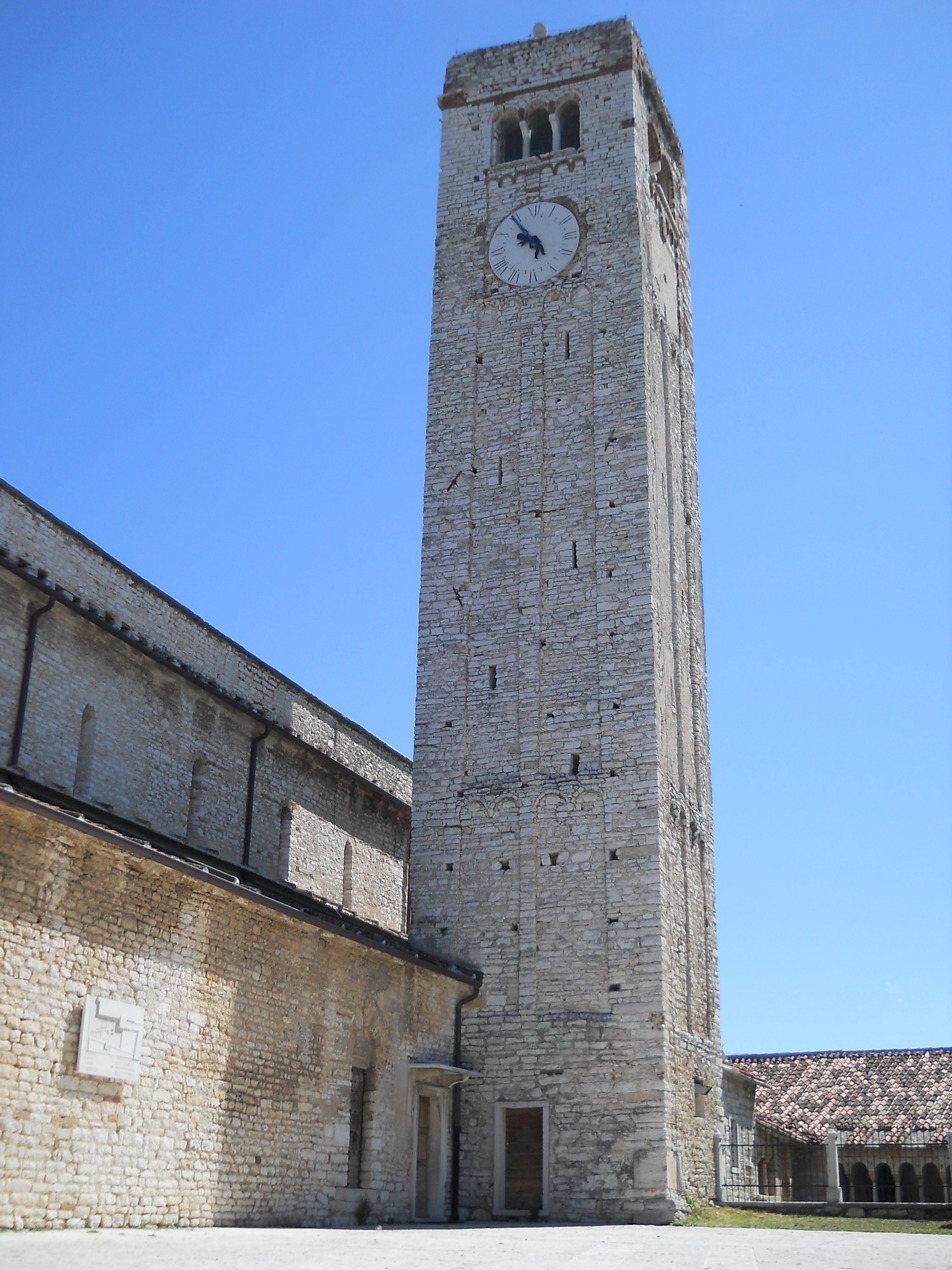
Bell tower

Historians agree with Arthur Kingsley Porter in considering the bell tower to be not of later date than the church. Veronese architectural scholar Arslan points out the similarities of the decorations, albeit made of different materials, to those of other bell towers of the period such as that of the basilica of San Zeno (dating from around 1120) and of the parish churches of San Martino a Negrar and San Floriano, and therefore speculates that the one at San Giorgio may be a crude imitation of the latter.

The bell tower is built on a square plan and its composition, in limestone of different sizes freshly hewn placed in horizontal rows, recalls the construction of the church's perimeter walls. Emerging from about 4-5 meters from the ground are one-meter wide corner lesenes. The plan of the belfry penetrates the perimeter of the church by a few centimeters, thus supporting the thesis that it could not have been built later than the church.

On the western flank the belfry is formed by a trifora (characteristic of late Veronese Romanesque architecture), under which is a clock, with composite stone arches supporting two monolithic columns with simple capitals. On the other sides, by contrast, as openings are mullioned windows with small arches built of brick and provided with a single column with capitals without any decoration.

The bell tower is about 5.5 meters long and protrudes from the north side of the church by 3.5 meters.

=== Interior ===
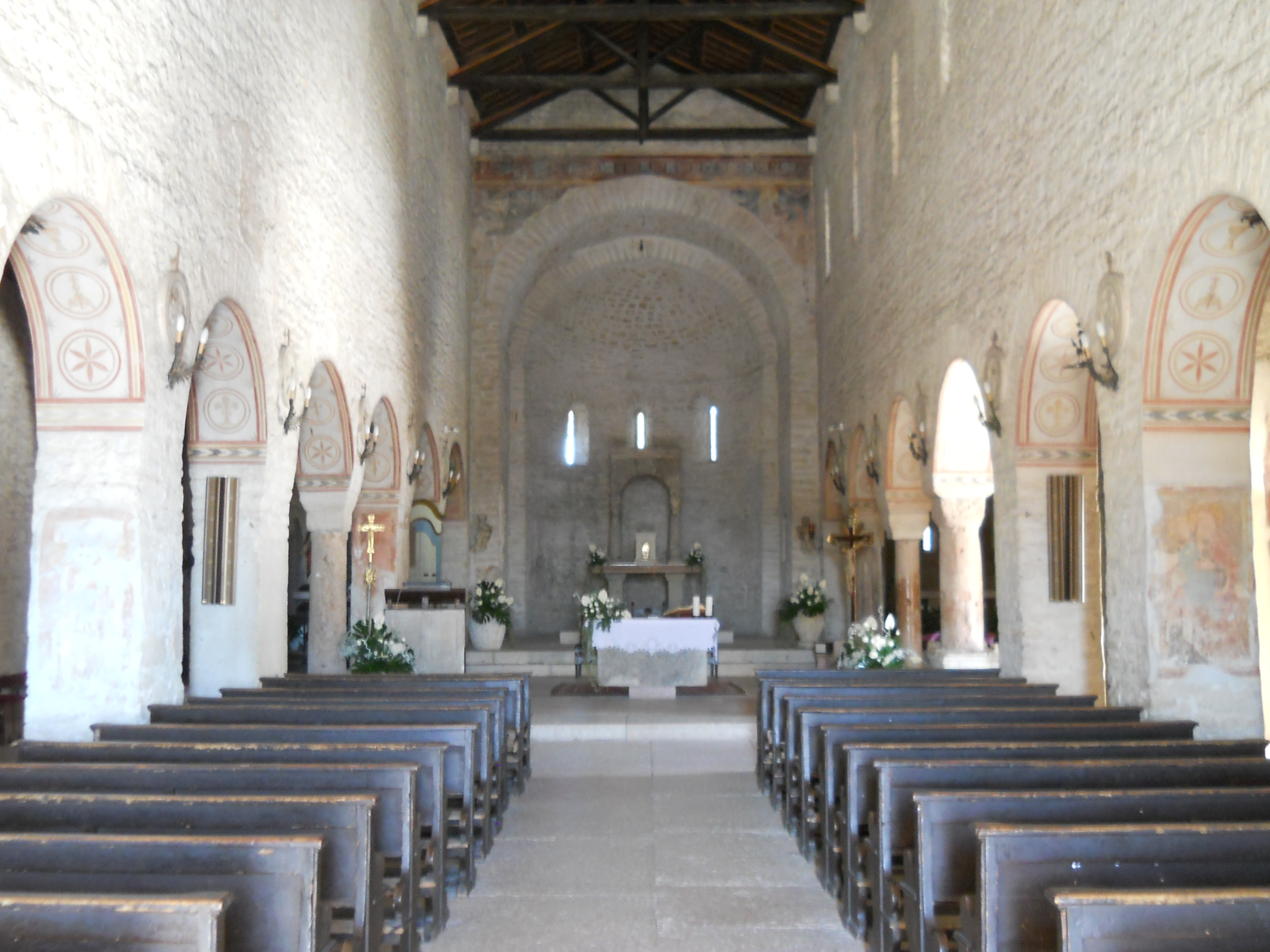
The nave of the parish church, ending in the apse where the Lombard ciborium is located

Pillars and columns determine the internal division of the church into three naves; the right side has four pillars and three columns, while the other side has five pillars, one of which is inserted between two columns. The pillars are all rectangular in shape, those on the left are without decoration, while those dividing the right aisle have paintings dated to the 14th century. On these one can distinguish depictions of: St. Catherine (on the first pillar from the entrance); a Bishop with mitre and crosier (on the second pillar); a Madonna and Child and St. Anthony the Abbot (on the third); another Madonna and St. Bartholomew (on the fourth); and finally Mary Magdalene on the last pillar. On both sides the columns and pillars support eight longitudinal arches, with soffits decorated with circles, floral motifs, stars, and chalices, painted red. The columns rest on bases made by reusing Roman altars. Engravings in Latin can still be read on three of them. (Note: In particular, the base of the first column to the south consists of a Roman altar made on a monolithic stone that has the following inscription, partially ruined: "SOLI ETIVNA - O SERTORIVS OF - FESTVS FLAMIN." In "Opere del romanico minore in Italia". Archived from the original on 20 March 2011.)

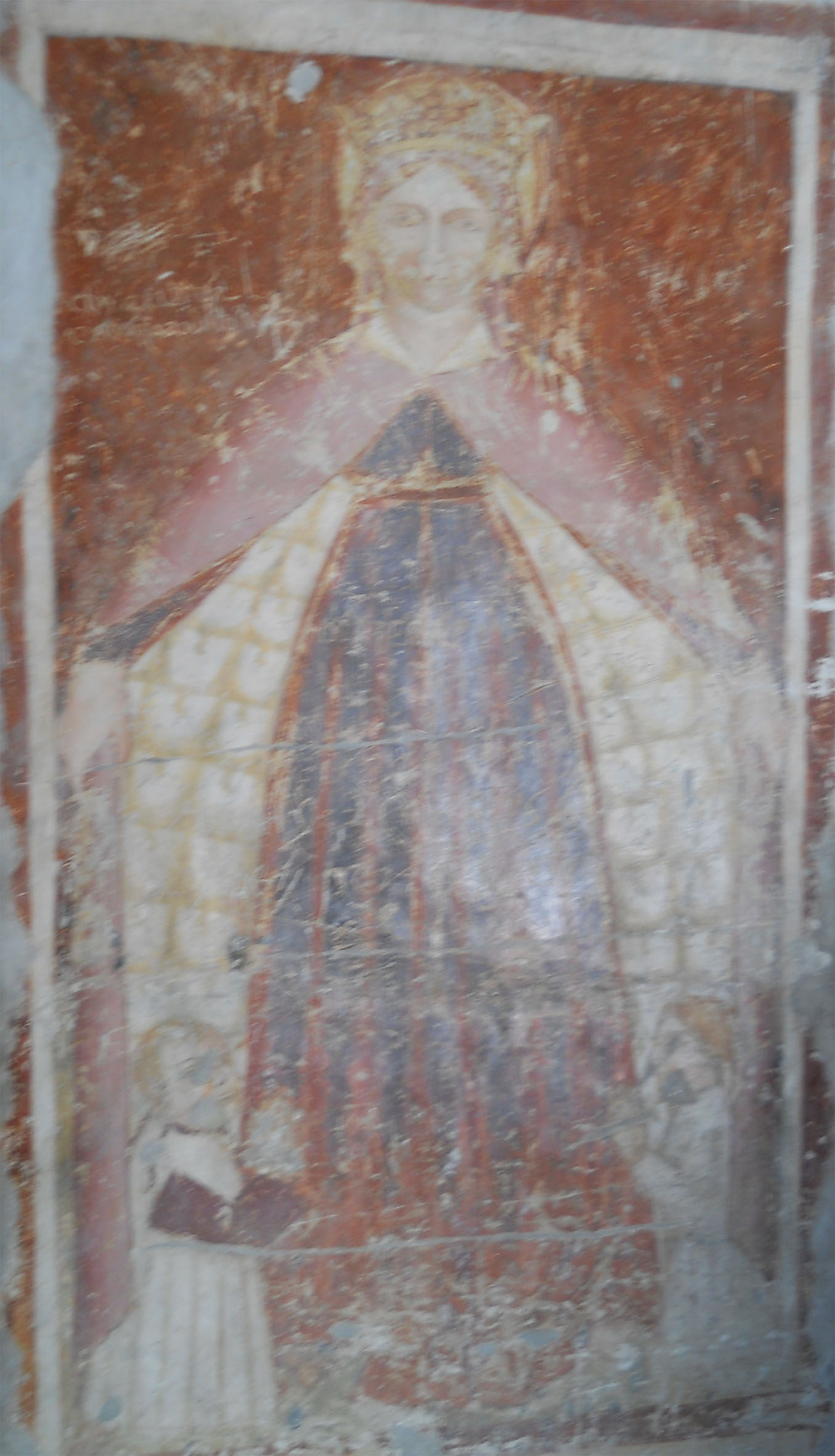
A painting probably depicting St. Bartholomew, on the fourth pillar dividing the right aisle

On the longitudinal wall, which divides the nave from the aisle, there are seven single-lancet windows on the right, while on the opposite side there is no opening. Also in the right aisle are two squared doors leading to the parvis (one of these walled up) and another leading to the cloister; the latter is surmounted by a plastered round arch.

In the apse located to the west there is now a neo-Gothic opening, which is the main entrance to the parish church of San Giorgio and is, inside, surrounded by frescoes. This part, most likely, belonged to the earlier Christian church, along with the large immersion baptismal font, made from a single block of stone, now located to the left of the entrance.

In the eastern wall, there are three apses, a central major one, where the altar is now located, and two minor ones on either side. The western area is lit by the three single-lancet windows in the major apse and the two inserted in each of the minor ones. Next to the north-facing wall is a sculpture of the Madonna surrounded by four saints, in Gothic style and made of stucco. In the center of the major apse is a small door leading to the niche where the chrism for baptisms is kept, while to its left is a small late Gothic tabernacle.

The mensa, which serves as the high altar, supports the ciborium, and consists of a stone slab bearing an inscription regarding its consecration, which presumably took place in August 1412. (Note: The inscription appears to be somewhat damaged and therefore there is no certainty about the year.)

The floor is covered with light-colored limestone tiles. In front of the entrance, also on the floor, is a circular slab (2.60 m in diameter) that indicated, according to one hypothesis, the spot where there was the seat of a public official, while according to another theory, it was the place where the baptismal font (now located in the left aisle) was placed. This one (of the immersion type) is made of local stone and is octagonal in shape; at one time it must have also had a bronze lid.

==== Frescoes ====
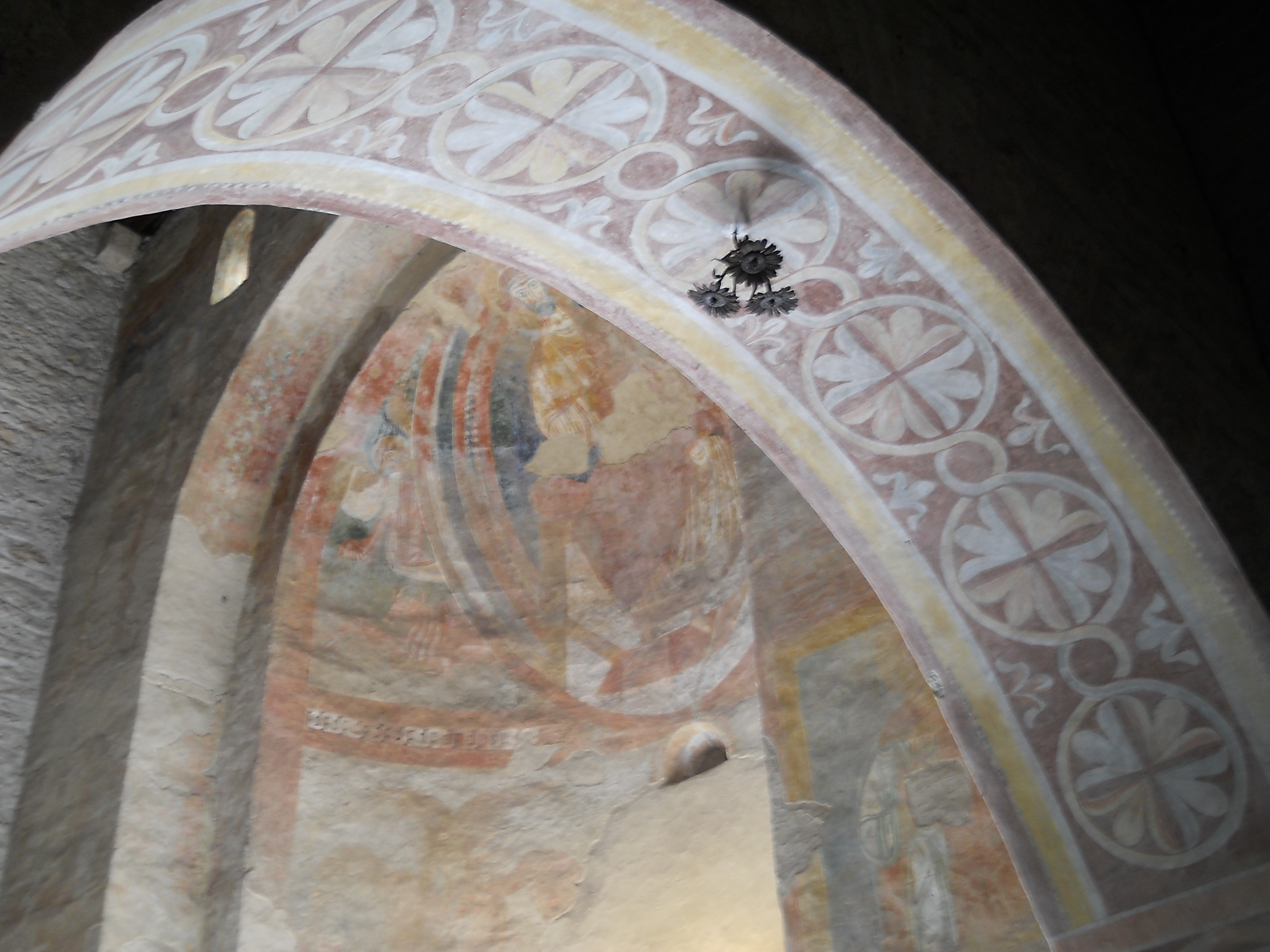
Detail of the decorations of the sub-arches and the western apse

The frescoes preserved here, although somewhat deteriorated, represent an interesting example of painting dated to the 11th century. (Note: Arslan, Toesca and Cipolla agree with this dating.) In the western apse is, placed in the semi-catin, a Christ Judge with a red cloak over his shoulder and surrounded by symbols of the evangelists. Three seraphim can be seen under the lap of the apse, while on the walls next to the apse area are depicted, on the right, a bearded saint wearing a short tunic streaked with green, and on the left a more youthful-looking soldier saint wearing a chlamys trimmed with gems.

On the opposite side, in the area of the present altar, is a triumphal arch trimmed with meanders, in which figures reminiscent of an angel, the baptism of Christ, and three old men in reddish robes with a green background can be seen. Analysis of these paintings reveals a certain resemblance to the frescoes painted by Fratel Bonizzo, in 1011, at the church of Sant'Urbano alla Caffarella in Rome.

On the right side of the church are some frescoes from a later period, a depiction of the Last Supper and Adam in the act of eating the forbidden apple. (Note: The painting is largely lost; it is thought to have originally depicted God driving Adam and Eve out of Eden or Adam redeemed by a woman placed as a symbol of the Church.) The left side is also frescoed but the paintings are now irreparably detached and almost illegible.

The canvases hanging on the walls of the minor aisles are mostly by Giovanni Battista Lanceni (including an 18th-century Martyrdom of St. George). Near the baptismal font is a Resurrection of Christ attributed to Palma il Giovane (16th century), which has been placed since 1840 and came from Venice.

===== The Last Supper =====
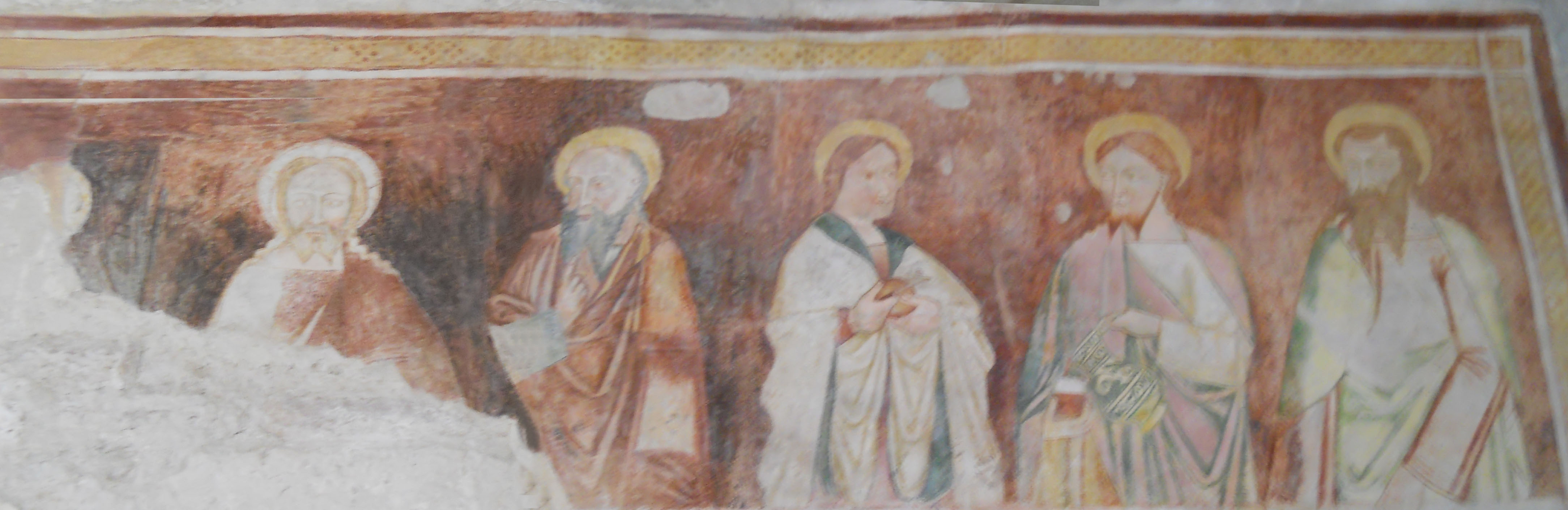
The fresco depicting the Last Supper

On the southern wall of the church, along the right aisle, is a fresco, dated to the 14th or 15th century, depicting the Last Supper characterized by the members of the banquet talking to each other and intent on pouring and drinking red wine as well as cutting and eating bread and fruit. However, the fresco has been severely affected by the interventions that the parish church has undergone over the centuries: in the 15th century plaster was laid over it during the work of plugging in one of the doors, but far more serious damage was sustained in the late 18th and early 19th centuries, when a new side opening was made; during the work, in fact, part of the fresco, on the left, was removed. Subsequent infiltrations of humidity, finally, caused some plaster falls and the worsening of the conservation conditions of the pictorial film. The recent restoration, however, has made it possible to consolidate the fresco and improve its legibility, thus enabling its evaluation from an iconographic and stylistic point of view.

Christ, as usual, is placed in the center of the scene and surrounded by his apostles; although he is mutilated in the lower part and much of the center of the painting has been lost, the presence of part of Judas' robe in front of Jesus suggests that the moment of the prediction of the betrayal was depicted, as also suggested by the restless appearance of one of the apostles who looks away and raises his hand. The others, on the other hand, are briskly in dialogue with each other and uninvolved in this event; there are those who are intent on drinking red wine and those who are pouring it into the glass, those who are cutting bread or fruit, and those who are eating. Peculiar to this work is especially the depiction of a rich table setting with objects typical of the time: on the table is a white tablecloth trimmed with green, bowls, ceramic plates, majolica mugs, glass bottles and glasses, and wooden-handled knives.

A table so richly set and laden with food is typical of the iconography prevalent at the time in northern and central Italy; the banquet, although less tied to the classical depiction of the sacred scene, allowed the viewer to be more involved, since in addition to the religious significance, he could grasp the atmosphere of abundance typical of feast days.

==== The ciborium ====
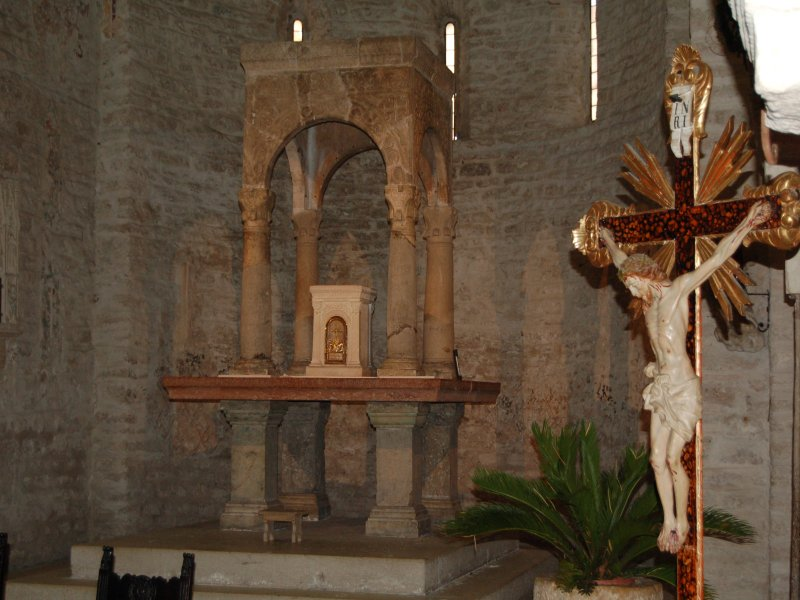
The famous ciborium

The ciborium, now used as the high altar, represents one of the most remarkable parts of the church, both for the historical evidence it bears (due to the precise inscriptions engraved here, a rare case for works from the Lombard-medieval period) and for its valuable artistic value.

On the ancient ciborium are inscriptions, in rustic characters, engraved on two small columns. Because of them it was possible to place the artifact accurately in history. On the first one the following inscription can be read:

In nomine Domini Jesu Christi. De donis sancti Juhannes Bapteste edificatus est hanc civorius sub tempore domno nostro Lioprando rege et viro beatissimo pater nostro Domnico epescopo et costodes eius venerabilibus Vidaliano et Tancol presbiteris et Refol gastaldio Gondelme indignus diaconus scripsi.
In the name of our Lord Jesus Christ. From the gifts of St. John the Baptist was built this ciborium, in the time of our sovereign lord Liutprand and our venerable father bishop Dominic, and its venerable custodians priests Vidaliano and Tancol, and gastald Refol. I, Godelmo, unworthy deacon, wrote.

The rest follows on the other column:

Ursus magester cum discepolis suis Juvintino et Juviano edificavet hane civorium, Vergondus, Teodoalfo scari
Master Orso with his disciples Iuvintino and Iuviano built this ciborium. Scari Vergondo and Teodoalfo

From the inscription engraved therein it is known that it was erected during the reign of Liutprand (who reigned between 712 and 744) while the diocese of Verona was governed by Bishop Dominic. Again owing to the inscriptions, the names of the rectors of the church (Vidaliano and Tancol) and those of other administrators (Vergondo and Teodoalfo) indicated, the latter, as scari, i.e., administrators of property at the local level. The inscription was commissioned by a certain Refol, a gastald of that time and probably a patron of artists. Also inscribed are the names of the builders: a certain Orso, master builder, with his pupils or disciples Iuvintino and Iuviano, names that reveal their Latin origin and thus can be considered the forerunners of the Lombard school of sculptors that, in those years, produced so many masterpieces for the basilicas of Northern Italy. (Note: At the Collegiate Church of Santa Maria in Ferentillo, in Umbria, there is another work, contemporary with the ciborium of San Giorgio, with the signature "Ursus magester fecit," but there is no other evidence to suggest with certainty that both belong to the same author or that it is simply a case of homonymy.)

The ciborium remained inside the Lombard church, probably, until its transformation into a Romanesque one, when it was broken down into various elements, used for other purposes. It seems, for example, that the four small columns that compose it were used, as early as 1412, to support the high altar (consecrated that year). In 1738 the altar, declared suspended following an episcopal visitation, was abandoned in the cloister where it remained until 1923.

The present ciborium is thus the result of reconstructions based on inscriptions. Its restoration is due to Alessandro Da Lisca, inspector of the monuments of Verona, who notes, however, that in all probability, as evidenced by the discovery of as many as seven archivolts, it must have originally been far more sumptuous and complete. (Note: Alessandro Da Lisca had this to say on the subject: "The most diligent examination of the fragments in their interlocking sides, and their number, and the examination of the compartments of the upper supports in the capitals of the columns, exclude that the work of Master Orso and his disciples Juventino and Juviano was limited to a simple canopy with four archivolts and four columns; on the contrary, it induces us to believe that those sculptors executed a true iconostasis by dividing the barbaric apse into two floors, which now appears disproportionately long; on the lower floor there must have been a kind of crypt, opened toward the church by a series of small arches resting on small columns; on the upper floor, accessed by side stairs, the altar and the ciborium proper." In Da Lisca.)

On the ciborium, interlaced ribbon decorations represent a feature also found in other Lombard works, for example in votive crosses, the altar of Duke Rachis, and the baptismal font of Patriarch Callistus in Cividale del Friuli.

== Museum ==
A museum is located next to the religious building. It comprises both an ethnographic museum, established in the 1970s, which documents local activities and traditions and inside which a typical Valpolicella kitchen is set up, and an archaeological museum, opened in 1992, which displays artifacts found on site such as Roman altars and inscriptions, Lombard and Carolingian sculptures and reliefs, and art objects from a variety of eras.

== See also ==
- Valpolicella
- Sant'Ambrogio di Valpolicella
- Roman Catholic Diocese of Verona

== Bibliography ==
- Arslan, Wart (1939). L'architettura romanica veronese. Verona: La Tipografica veronese.
- Arslan, Wart (1943). La scultura e la pittura veronese dal secolo VIII al secolo XII. Milano: Bocca.
- Biancolini, Gianbattista (1750). Notizie storiche delle chiese di Verona. Verona.
- Billo, Luisa (1935). Le iscrizioni veronesi dell'Alto medioevo. Archivio Veneto, XVI. Venezia: Ferrari.
- Cattaneo, Raffaele (1888). L'architettura italiana dal secolo VI al Mille circa: ricerche storico-critiche. Venezia: Tipografia Emiliana. pp. 82–83.
- Cipolla, Carlo (1898). "La chiesa di San Giorgio Ingannapoltron e i freschi nuovamente in essa rinvenuti". Arte e Storia. Vol. XVIII. Verona.
- Da Lisca, Alessandro (1924). "San Giorgio di Valpolicella". Miscellanea per le nozze Brenzoni-Giacometti. Verona: Casa buoni fanciulli.
- Forchielli, Giuseppe (1928). Collegialità di chierici nel Veronese: dall'VIII secolo all'età comunale. Archivio Veneto, III. Venezia: Ferrari.
- Kingsley Porter, Arthur (1917). Lombard Architecture. New Haven: Yale University Press. p. 363.
- Orti Manara, Girolamo (1840). Di due antichissimi tempj cristiani veronesi: San Giorgio di Valpolicella e San Pietro in Castello. Verona.
- Priuli Bon, Lorenzo (1912). Intorno alla chiesa di San Giorgio in Valpolicella.
- Simeoni, Luigi (1909). Guida storico artistica di Verona e Provincia. Verona: Baroni.
- Toesca, Pietro (1927). "Il Medioevo". Storia dell'Arte Italiana. Torino: Unione tipografico-editrice torinese. pp. 150 e 387.
- Bogoni, Barbara (2009). Libero Cecchini. Natura e archeologia al fondamento dell'architettura. Firenze: Alinea. pp. 430–437.
- Bolla, Margherita (1999). La chiesa di San Giorgio di Valpolicella. Verona: Pro loco San Giorgio di Valpolicella.
- Brugnoli, Andrea; Cortellazzo, Francesco (2011–2012). "L'iscrizione del ciborio di San Giorgio di Valpolicella". Annuario Storico della Valpolicella. Vol. XXVIII.
- Piccoli, Fausta (2013–2014). "Un'Ultima cena nella pieve di San Giorgio e un pittore in Valpolicella all'alba del XV secolo". Annuario Storico della Valpolicella. XXX.
- Rovagnati, Sergio (2003). I Longobardi. Milano: Xenia.
- Silvestri, Giuseppe (1983). La Valpolicella. Centro di documentazione per la storia della Valpolicella.
- Tagliaferri, Amelio (1965). I Longobardi nella civiltà e nell'economia italiana del primo medioevo. Milano: Giuffrè.
