= Pescantina =

- Comune
- Comune di Pescantina
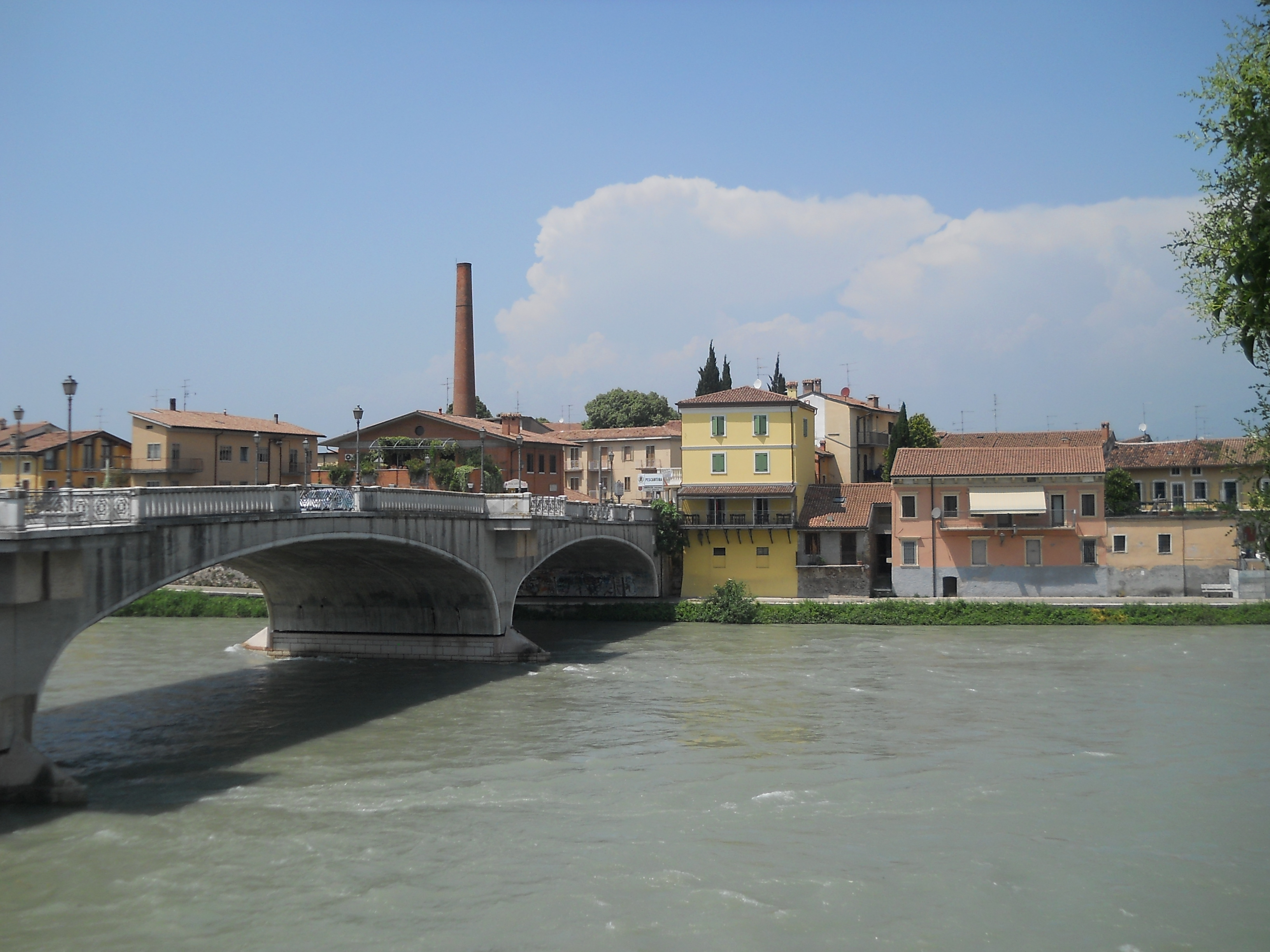

- Location within Italy Location within Veneto
- Coordinates: 45°29′N 10°52′E
- Country: Italy
- Region: Veneto
- Province: Province of Verona (VR)
- Frazioni: Settimo, Balconi, Arcè, Ospedaletto, Santa Lucia

Area
  - Total: 19.7 km^{2} (7.6 sq mi)
- Elevation: 80 m (260 ft)

Population (Dec. 2004)
  - Total: 14,096
  - Density: 716/km^{2} (1,850/sq mi)
- Demonym: Pescantinesi
- Time zone: UTC+1 (CET)
  - Summer (DST): UTC+2 (CEST)
- Postal code: 37026
- Dialing code: 045
- Website: Official website

Pescantina is a comune (municipality) in the Province of Verona in the Italian region Veneto, located about 110 kilometres (68 mi) west of Venice and about 11 kilometres (7 mi) northwest of Verona. As of 31 December 2004, it had a population of 14,096 and an area of 19.7 square kilometres (7.6 mi^{2}).

The municipality of Pescantina contains the frazioni (subdivisions, mainly villages and hamlets) Settimo, Balconi, Arcè, Ospedaletto, and Santa Lucia.

Pescantina borders the following municipalities: Bussolengo, Pastrengo, San Pietro in Cariano, Sant'Ambrogio di Valpolicella, and Verona.

== Demographic evolution ==
Historical population

Year	Pop.	±%
1861	?	—
1871	3,935	—
1881	4,286	+8.9%
1901	3,972	−7.3%
1911	4,200	+5.7%

Year	Pop.	±%
1921	4,649	+10.7%
1931	5,900	+26.9%
1936	6,190	+4.9%
1951	6,896	+11.4%
1961	7,199	+4.4%

Year	Pop.	±%
1971	7,711	+7.1%
1981	8,900	+15.4%
1991	9,777	+9.9%
2001	12,414	+27.0%

Source: Data from ISTAT

== Twin towns ==
Pescantina is twinned with:

- Siedlce, Poland, since 1993
