= Devotion of Verona to Venice =

Loyalty oath by Verona to Venice after its conquest

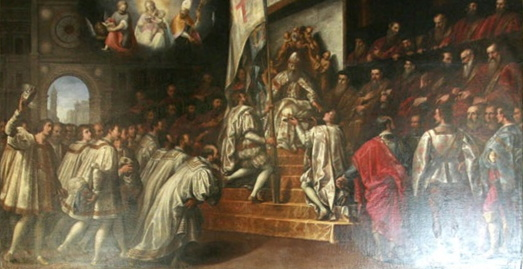
- Painting by Jacopo Ligozzi depicting Verona's Capitano del Popolo, Pietro da Sacco, delivering the keys of Verona to the Venetian Doge Michele Steno.
- Signed: July 26, 1405
- Signatories: (Verona) Pietro Da Sacco (Venice) Michele Steno

The Devotion of Verona to Venice was a feudal oath of loyalty made by Verona to Venice, via Veronese ambassadors to Venice, pronounced on June 24, 1405. The devotion came after the conquest of the town by Venetian troops during the War of Padua: Venice profited from internal ill-will in Verona against the Carrara rulers of Padua (and from riots in the town), allowing its army in, helped in part by the people, and forcing the Carrara to flee.

== Arrival of the Venetian representatives in Verona ==
The Veronese acclaimed Pietro Da Sacco as Capitano del popolo who then had the task of negotiating the dedication of the city with the representatives of the Venetian Republic. The Veronese ambassadors, led by Pietro Da Sacco, met the Venetian delegation headed by Gabriele Emo and Jacopo Dal Verme at Porta Vescovo, Verona. Three companies of Venetian infantrymen were allowed in to guard the square while the Veronese ambassadors went to the Venetian Campo in the castle of Montorio.

The honorable conditions of dedication were established there: Verona was allowed to continue to enjoy the freedom deriving from the podestà to convene the senate, create magistrates, make laws and govern the city and public affairs, leaving the Venetian senators the labor, the dangers and the expense (Francesco Scipione), and privileges were given to the peasants of the Valpolicella for having been in favor of the Republic of Venice during the wars against the Visconti of Milan. Conditions which less than a month later, on 16 July, were solemnly reaffirmed in Venice, in a ducal document with a golden bull, an official letter from the Doge of Venice, bearing a gold seal and having the force of law.

On 23 June, the Venetians entered Verona through the Calzaro gate, between the Porta Nuova and the Palio gates. The event was consecrated with the appointment of many knights including Pietro Da Sacco. A Te Deum of thanksgiving was sung in the cathedral and the new Venetian authorities lodged in the palace that had belonged to the Scaliger family. The Venetians officially took possession of Verona, also militarily.

== See also ==
- Verona
- Republic of Venice
- History of the Republic of Venice
- Vicariate of Valpolicella

== Bibliography ==
- G. Solinas. Storia di Verona. Verona, Centro Rinascita, 1981.
- Il primo dominio veneziano a Verona (1405-1509). Verona, Accademia di agricoltura, scienze e lettere di Verona, 1991.
