= Porta San Giorgio, Verona =

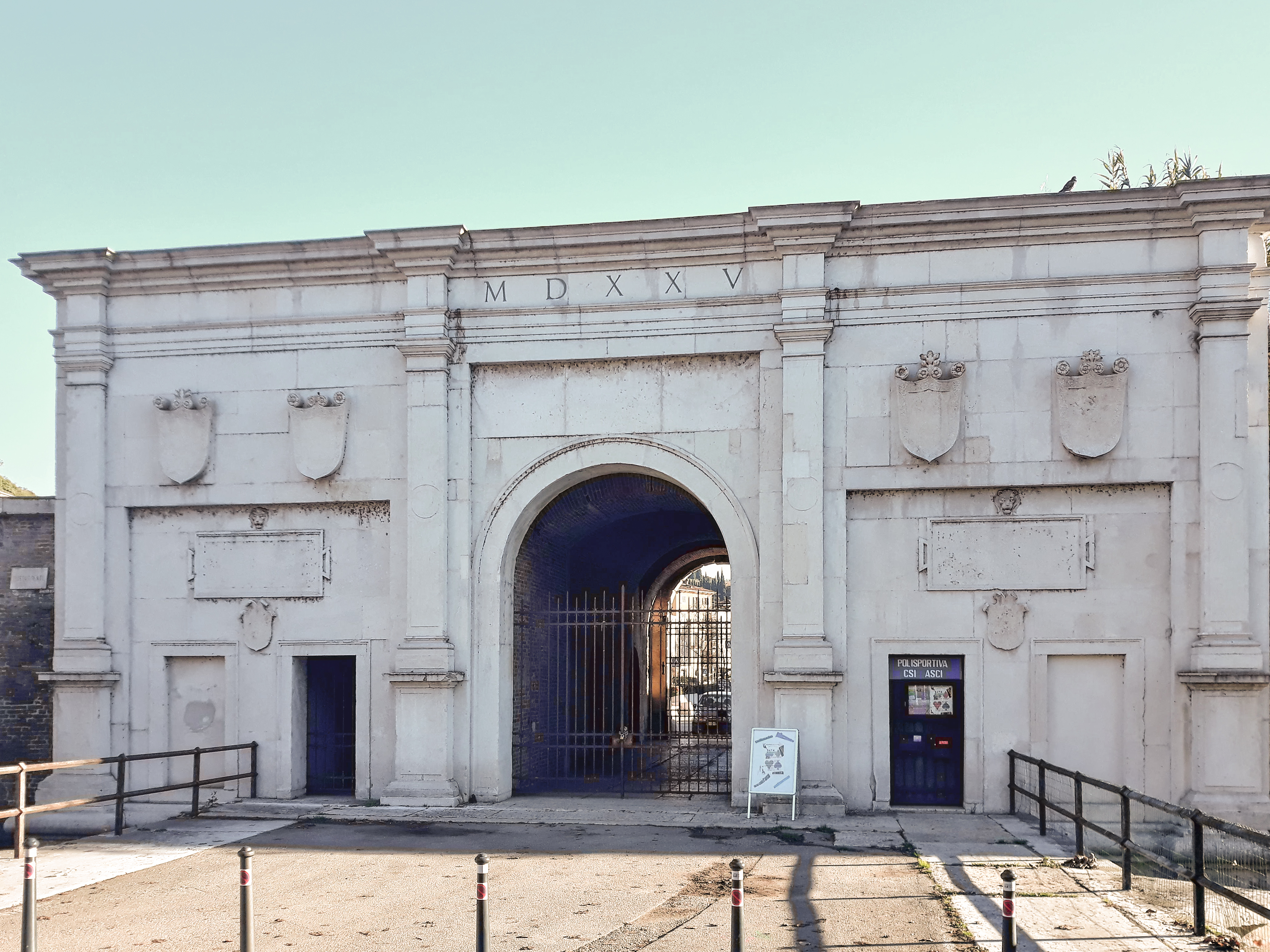

Porta San Giorgio was a gate or portal of the former outer medieval walls of the city of Verona, Italy.

The first gate here constructed by Cangrande I della Scala, between 1321 and 1324. Under Venetian rule, the walls of Verona were enlarged, and this gate was rebuilt, starting in 1525 under designs of Giovanni Maria Falconetto. The work remained incomplete until 1840, when completed under Austrian rule. Of the Renaissance style remains the outer wall, resembling a triumphal arch. The composition is in Doric style, adorned with shields and weapons. At one time, the gate had a moat and drawbridge. The interior passageway had slits for weapons.

Porta San Giorgio was the access from left bank of Adige River. The name derives from nearby church of San Giorgio in Braida, with a dome designed by Sanmicheli.
