= San Pietro in Cariano =

San Pietro in Cariano San Piero in Carian
- Comune
- Comune di San Pietro in Cariano
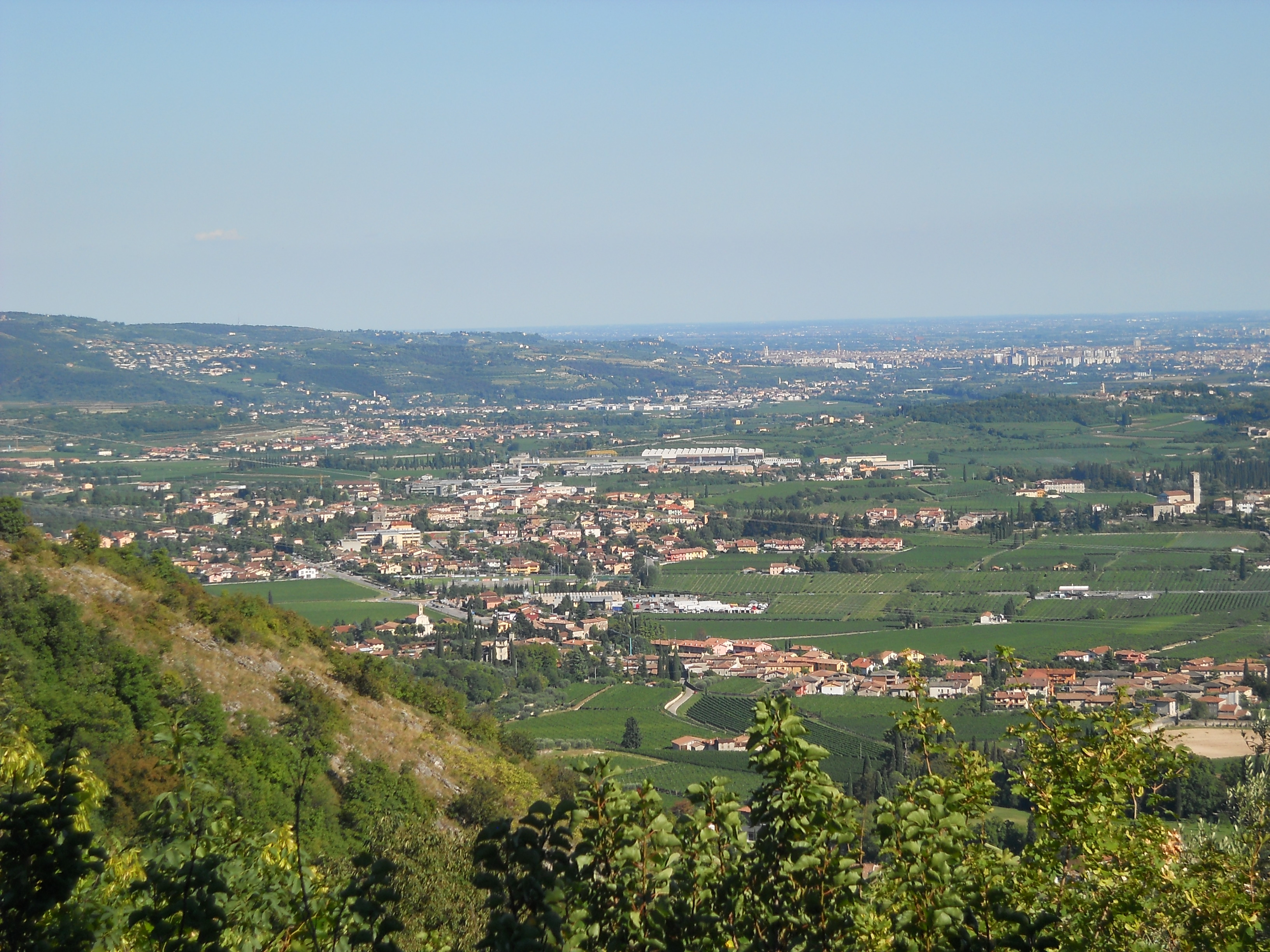

- Location within Italy Location within Veneto
- Coordinates: 45°31′N 10°53′E
- Country: Italy
- Region: Veneto
- Province: Verona (VR)
- Frazioni: Bure, Castelrotto, Corrubbio, Pedemonte, San Floriano,

Government
  - Mayor: Gerardo Zantedeschi

Area
  - Total: 20.25 km^{2} (7.82 sq mi)
- Elevation: 151 m (495 ft)

Population (31 December 2025)
  - Total: 12,996
  - Density: 641.8/km^{2} (1,662/sq mi)
- Demonym: Carianesi
- Time zone: UTC+1 (CET)
  - Summer (DST): UTC+2 (CEST)
- Postal code: 37029
- Dialing code: 045
- Patron saint: St. Peter Apostle
- Saint day: 29 June
- Website: Official website

San Pietro in Cariano (Venetian: San Piero in Carian) is a comune (municipality) in the Province of Verona in the Italian region Veneto, located about 110 kilometres (68 mi) west of Venice and about 12 kilometres (7 mi) northwest of Verona. It is located in the geographical region of Valpolicella.

The main attraction is the Romanesque pieve of San Floriano (10th century) and Villa Serego, a Palladian villa designed by Andrea Palladio.

== Twin towns ==
San Pietro in Cariano is twinned with:

- Ingelheim am Rhein, Germany
- Ludlow, England, United Kingdom
- Stans, Austria

== See also ==
- Vicariate of Valpolicella
