= First Italian War of Independence =

1848–1849 conflict in Europe

- Part of the revolutions of 1848 in Italy and the unification of Italy
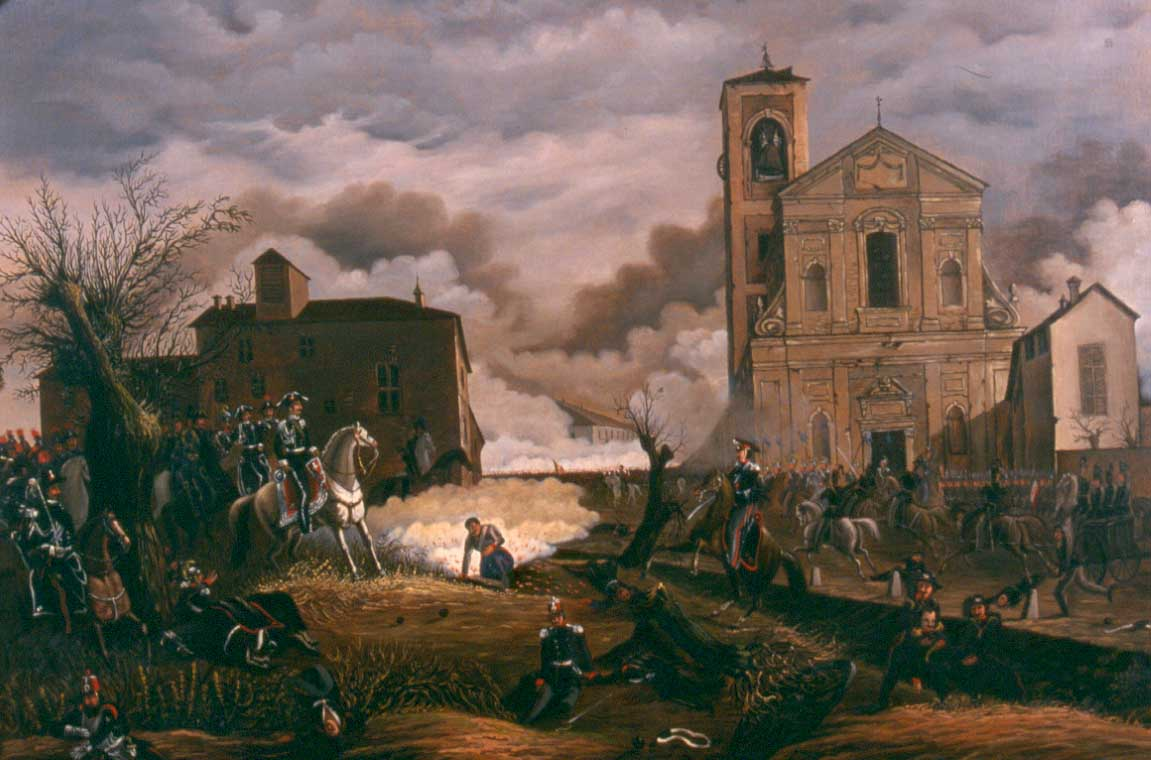
- Arrival of King Carlo Alberto at the Battle of Novara
Date	23 March 1848 – 22 August 1849 (1 year, 4 months, 4 weeks and 2 days)
Location	Lombardy–Venetia and Piedmont
Result	Austrian victory
Territorial changes	Return to the status quo ante bellum

Belligerents
Kingdom of Sardinia; Italian Volunteer Army; Supported by: Provisional Government of Milan; Republic of San Marco; Kingdom of Sicily; Grand Duchy of Tuscany; Duchy of Modena and Reggio; Duchy of Parma and Piacenza; Roman Republic	Austrian Empire (French Second Republic) French Republic

Commanders and leaders
Charles Albert # Victor Emmanuel II; Alfonso Ferrero La Marmora	(Austrian Empire) Joseph Radetzky von Radetz (French Second Republic) Louis-Napoléon Bonaparte

Strength
115,000 men; 22,000 men	(Austrian Empire) 100,000 men; (French Second Republic) 40,000 men

Casualties and losses
1848: Unknown; 1849: 17,400+; 2,400 killed; 5,000 wounded; 10,000 captured; Unknown disease deaths	1848: 9,139; 4,872 killed/missing; 3,348 wounded; 919 captured; 1849: 6,441; 1,145 killed/missing; 2,944 wounded; 352 captured; 2,000+ disease deaths; Total: 15,580+

The First Italian War of Independence (Italian: Prima guerra d'indipendenza italiana), part of the Risorgimento or unification of Italy, was fought by the Kingdom of Sardinia (Piedmont) and Italian volunteers against the Austrian Empire and other conservative states from 23 March 1848 to 22 August 1849 in the Italian Peninsula. The conflict was preceded by the outbreak of the Sicilian revolution of 1848 against the House of Bourbon-Two Sicilies. It was precipitated by riots in the cities of Milan (Five Days) and Venice, which rebelled against Austria and established governments.

The part of the conflict which was fought by King Charles Albert of Sardinia against Austria in Northern Italy was a royal war and consisted of two campaigns. In both campaigns, Sardinian forces attacked the Austrian Empire and after initial victories, Sardinia was decisively defeated and lost the war. The decisive events of the first and second campaigns were the battles of Custoza and Novara respectively. At the beginning of the royal war, Sardinia was supported by the Papal States and the Kingdom of the Two Sicilies, though both quickly withdrew from the conflict. However, volunteers from the Papal and Neapolitan armies joined the other Italian volunteers and fought against Austria.

Besides the royal war, revolutionary movements took place in various Italian states (Papal States, Tuscany, etc.), part of the revolutions of 1848 in the Italian states, which could not be reconciled with the liberal ideals of Piedmont. Historiography treats those revolutions and the Sicilian Revolution of 23 March 1848 as a popular war. It also failed, ending in the restoration of traditional institutions and forcing many rebels into exile. In the popular war with the internal revolutionaries, the Kingdom of Two Sicilies and the Papal States found themselves on the side opposite to the one they had been on during the royal war when they had initially supported Piedmont. The popular war gave prominence to the military commander Giuseppe Garibaldi. He was defeated, as was King Charles Albert, who abdicated at the war's end in favour of his eldest son, Victor Emmanuel.

== The revolutions of 1848 ==
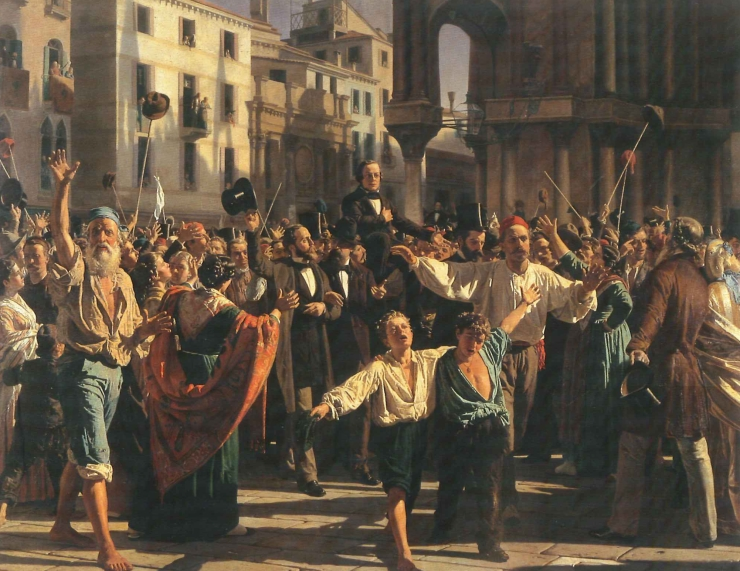
Daniele Manin carried in triumph following the liberation of Venice on 17 March 1848 (detail from a painting by Napoleone Nani, 1876)

In 1848 revolutionary riots broke out in many parts of Europe, including numerous places in what is now Emilia-Romagna and other parts of Italy. Ferdinand II of the Two Sicilies was forced to grant a constitution on 23 January and his example was followed by Leopold II of Tuscany on 17 February, Charles Albert of Sardinia on 17 February (the Albertine Statute), and Pope Pius IX for the Papal States on 14 March (the Fundamental Statute). Charles II, Duke of Parma was ousted. Sicily, excepting Messina, revolted against the Bourbon Kingdom of the Two Sicilies.

On 23 February, the French Revolution of 1848 broke out against Louis Philippe. In March, the revolts also spread into the Austrian Empire, where Milan (Five Days of Milan) and Venice (Republic of San Marco) rebelled against the House of Habsburg.

The battles were particularly heated in Milan, where the commander of the army of Lombardy–Venetia, Marshal Josef Radetzky, was forced to abandon the city. As a result of this, other revolts broke out in Lombardy–Venetia, such as that at Como. With Vienna itself in revolt, the Austrian Empire was tottering.

On 23 March, one day after the end of the Five Days of Milan, King Charles Albert of Sardinia declared war on Austria. He was probably spurred to this by the desire to avoid a revolution in his own country, which was itself a liberal monarchy, and by the hope that he could use the rebellions in Lombardy–Venetia as an opportunity to expand his own kingdom. Thus began the first Italian war of independence.

== Summary of strategic situation and forces ==
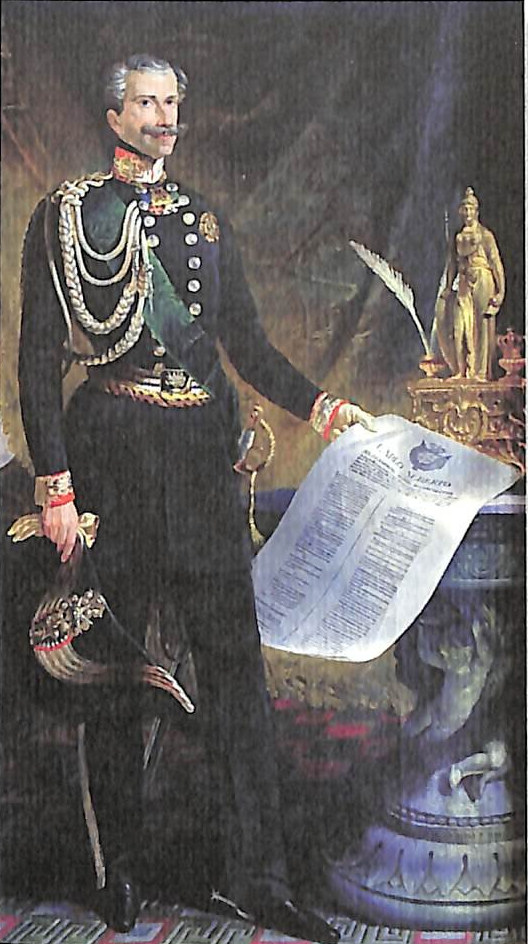
King Charles Albert of Sardinia, who declared war on Austria on 23 March 1848

As a result of the revolts of Milan and Venice, from 23 March 1848, the Austrians had to retreat into the Quadrilateral fortresses (Peschiera, Verona, Mantua, and Legnago) which formed the defensive nucleus of the Habsburg army in Lombardy–Venetia. To the east, west, and south of the Quadrilateral, forces of volunteers from the Italian states began to gather in order to fight against the Austrians. The Austrian forces were only able to maintain links to the motherland via a corridor to the north, running through the Adige valley on the eastern coast of Lake Garda.

=== The Piedmontese army ===
The army of the Kingdom of Sardinia was mobilized on 1 March 1848, at the beginning of the revolt in Milan, and was at 4/5 strength, with about 65,000 men.

The Piedmontese army was headed by Charles Albert, Minister for War General Antonio Franzini, and General Eusebio Bava. The latter directly commanded the 1st Army Corps, consisting of two divisions under Generals Federico Millet d'Arvillars and Vittorio Garretti di Ferrere. The 2nd Army Corps was directed by Ettore De Sonnaz, with Giovanni Battista Federici and Mario Broglia commanding its two divisions. The 5th Division, containing the reserves, was under the command of Charles Albert's heir Victor Emmanuel, Duke of Savoy. Finally, command of the artillery fell to Ferdinand of Savoy, Duke of Genoa.

Before crossing the Ticino river, which marked the border between the Kingdom of Sardinia and Lombardy–Venetia, Charles Albert decided that the war flag would be the Italian tricolor with the Savoyard arms at the centre.

=== Other Italian armies and Volunteers ===
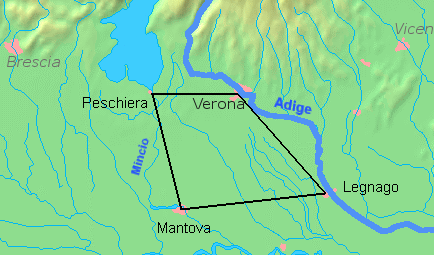
The Quadrilateral fortresses, the defensive core of the Austrian army in Lombardy–Venetia

Italy at the time of the First War of Independence

All the other monarchies of the peninsula that had been forced to join the war against Austria due to public sentiment in their respective countries sent military contingents to Lombardy–Venetia, but without conviction.

The first to arrive was the Papal Army, with a contingent of 17–18,000 men (including roughly 900 cavalry soldiers and 22 cannons). It consisted of a regular division (10–11,000 men including 3–4,000 volunteers) under the command of the Piedmontese Giovanni Durando and a second division (around 7,000 men) made up of the Mobile Civic Guard and of volunteers under the republican Andrea Ferrari. The Army Corps entered Lombardy–Venetia from the Apostolic legation of Ferrara. A group of around 130 volunteers, called the Bersaglieri del Po also came from Ferrara.

The Grand Duchy of Tuscany entered the war on 21 March and sent a Corps of around 6,400 men to Mantua, partially regular troops and partially volunteers. The contingent was commanded initially by Ulisse d'Arco Ferrari and subsequently by Cesare de Laugier. These troops had little technical training but were highly enthusiastic, especially the so-called "Battalion of Students", led by Astronomy professor Ottaviano-Fabrizio Mossotti.

In Parma and Modena, the respective dukes, Charles II and Francis V, had abandoned their thrones in the face of popular riots, allowing the formation of provisional governments. A few hundred volunteers set out for Lombardy-Veneto.

The major contribution to the war was to be made by Ferdinand II of Two Sicilies, who promised to send a Corps of 25,000 men. This contingent did not leave on time and when it was sent in March it contained around 11,000 men. King Ferdinand II was politically very far from the Piedmontese liberal ideology and his highest priority was the reconquest of Sicily, which had revolted on 26 March 1848 under the leadership of Ruggero Settimo. Commanded by Guglielmo Pepe, the Neapolitan troops arrived in the theatre of war only in mid-May, when, as they were crossing the Po from the south, they received the order to return home. Only a few units loyal to Guglielmo Pepe entered Veneto and participated in the fighting.

However, the anti-Austrian coalition could rely on other forces. There were Lombard volunteers (4,500 men), Neapolitan volunteers (1,600 men), and Venetian volunteers from the Republic of San Marco. The last group consisted of around 9,000 men, organised as regular units by Daniele Manin and directed principally against the enemy forces which had crossed the Soča from the east in order to reinforce the Habsburg troops in Lombardy–Venetia. They were commanded by generals Carlo Zucchi and Alberto della Marmora.

All these armies were completely uncoordinated with one another and were motivated by very different political ideals, ranging from those who sought to unite with the Kingdom of Sardinia, to those who desired an Italian republic.

=== The Austrian army ===
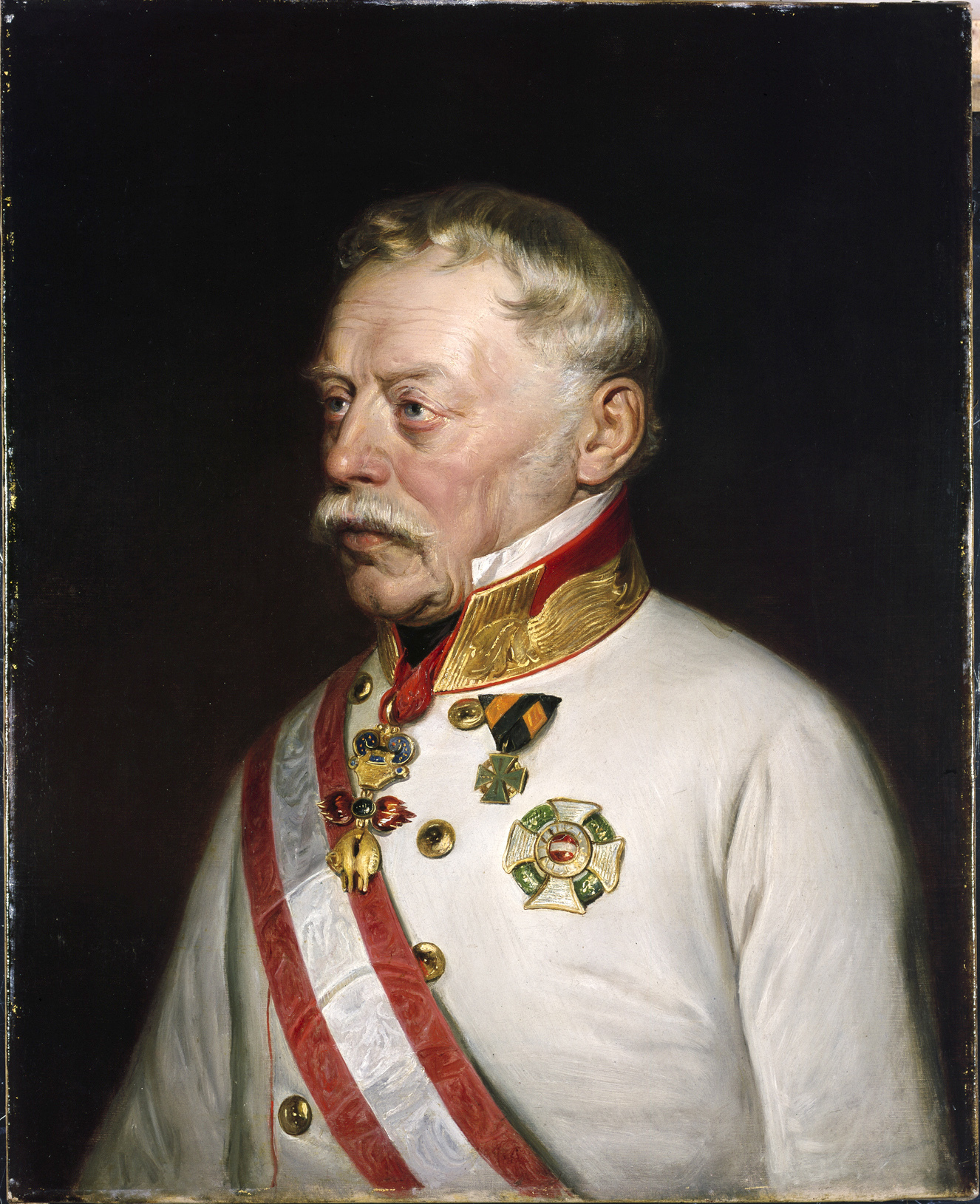
General Josef Radetzky, commander of the Austrian army in Lombardy–Venetia, portrait by Georg Decker (1818–1894)

The multiethnic Austrian army in Lombardy–Venetia was commanded by the 81-year-old General Josef Radetzky, a man whose past experience had earned him exceptional autonomy from the Viennese bureaucracy. He had organised the army in Italy according to his own ideas, including the idea that army training was necessary even in times of peace – a theory that few followed in this period. The result was that when the war broke out his soldiers were ready and, in particular, were familiar with the territory in which they would need to fight.

Before the insurrections at Milan and Venice, Radetzky had 70,000 men in two armies: the 1st in Lombardy and the 2nd in Venetia, containing a total of 61 battalions of infantry. After the revolt, as a result of casualties, surrenders, and desertions, this was reduced to 41 effective battalions. There were also 35 squadrons of cavalry and 100 pieces of artillery. Given that the average force of the Austrian battalions was around 1,000 men, Radetzky had a total of around 50,000 men at the start of the war. He further ordered that a reserve force of 20,000 soldiers be gathered in a hurry under the command of Laval Nugent von Westmeath from the Austrian side of the Soča and from Carinthia.

== The initial phase of the first campaign (March–May 1848) ==
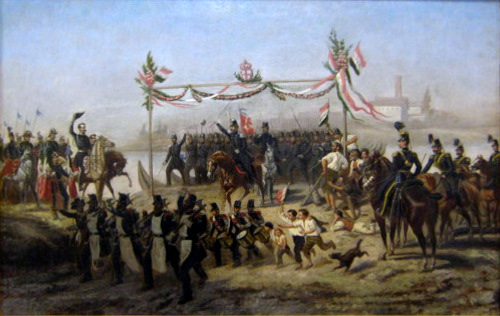
King Charles Albert of Sardinia with his bicorne hat in his hand, at left, greets the Piedmontese troops after they have crossed the Ticino. Painting by Stanislao Grimaldi (1825–1903).

=== Piedmontese advance towards the Quadrilateral (23 March – 7 April 1848) ===
On 23 March, the Kingdom of Sardinia declared war on the Austrian Empire. On 25 and 26 March, two advance guards crossed the River Ticino, entering enemy territory. The body of the army crossed on 29 March. That same day, the first three divisions entered Pavia, where they were acclaimed by the people.

Charles Albert decided to ignore these and advance towards Cremona on the Po. From there they advanced to Marcaria and crossed the Oglio on 7 April, some twenty kilometres from Mantua, the southernmost fortress of the Quadrilateral.

Only one of the advance guards was sent to Brescia – this consisted of a brigade of infantry, a regiment of cavalry, and a battery of cannons and was commanded by general Michele Giuseppe Bes (1794–1853), who had already crossed the Ticino at Boffalora and entered Milan.

That same day, Radetzky retreated to Peschiera and two days after that to Verona. On 8 April, the majority of his troops (the 1st Army), was stationed in the Quadrilateral at Villafranca. The Piedmontese army, on the other hand, was arrayed along the west bank of the Mincio.

=== Crossing the Mincio River (8–27 April 1848) ===
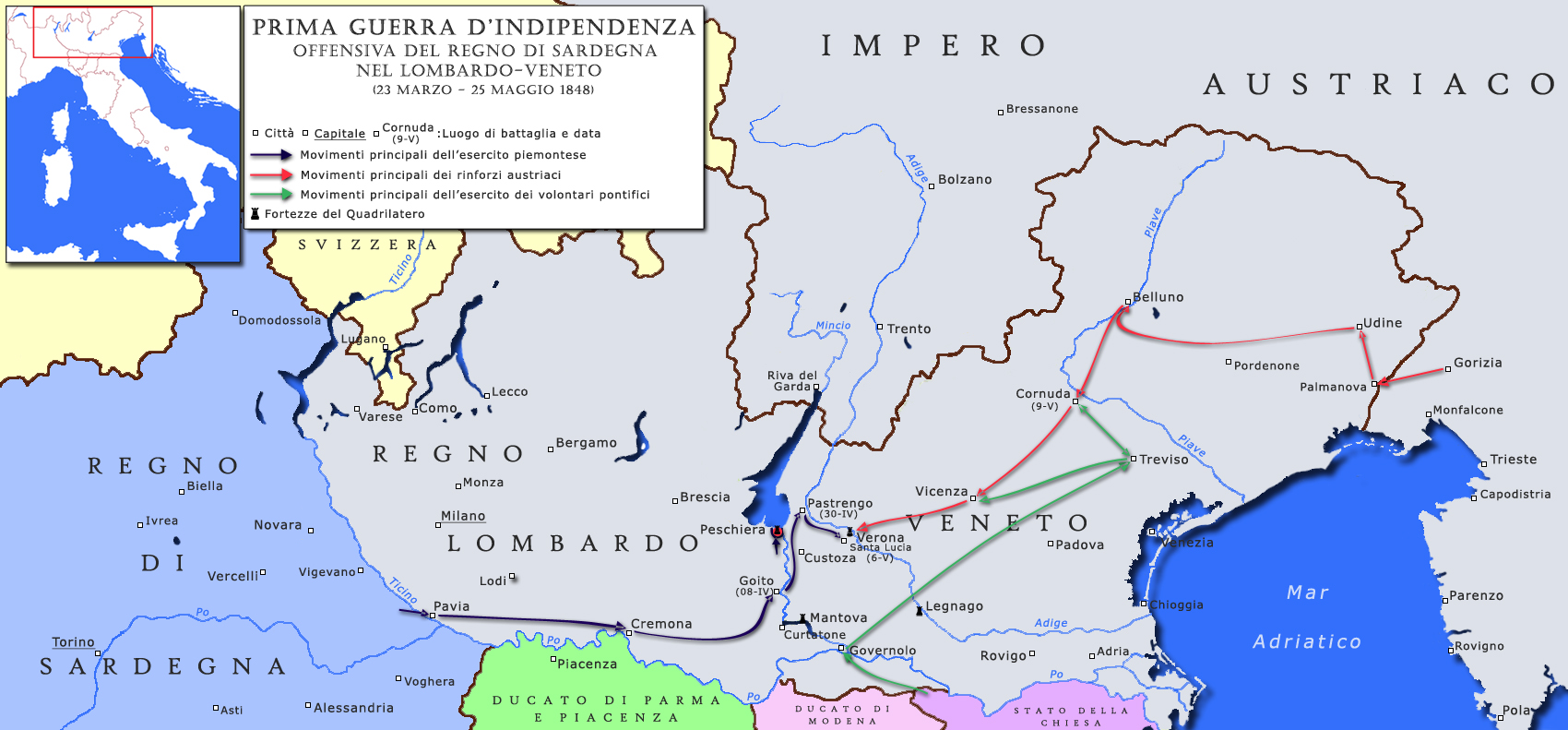
Course of the first phase of the first campaign (up to 25 May 1848)

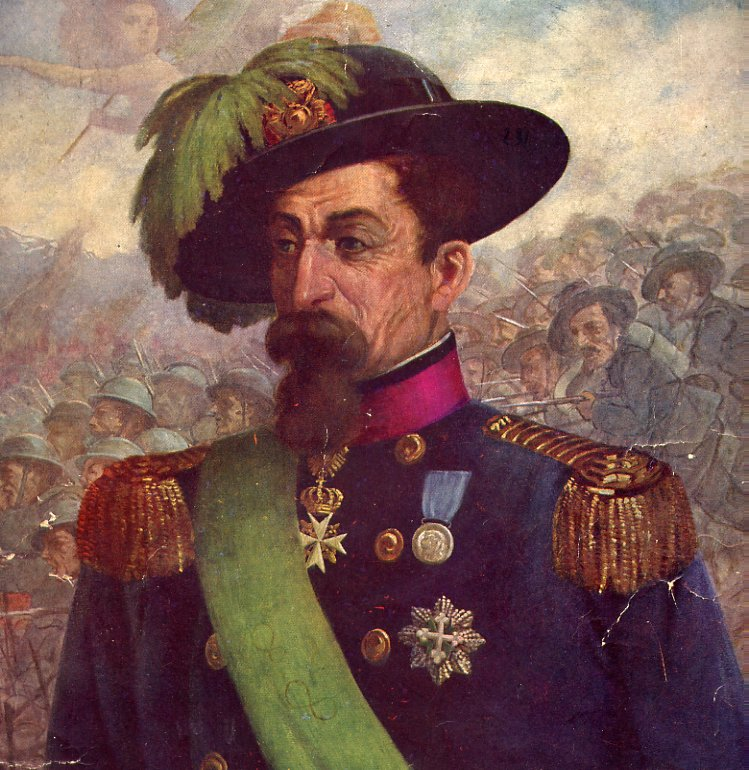
Alessandro La Marmora, founder of the bersaglieri, was seriously wounded at the Battle of Goito Bridge.

Since all the bridges over the Mincio were still held by the Austrian rear-guard, on 8 April, General Bava ordered the divisions of General d'Arvillars to seize the Bridge at Goito. After sharp clashes, during which the Austrian engineers managed to partially demolish the bridge, Bersaglieri battalions and the Royal Sardinian Navy managed to break through to the other bank. The engagement came to be known as the Battle of Goito Bridge (la Battaglia del Ponte di Goito).Around 4pm the work of the Piedmontese engineers, enabled the passage of another 3 battalions, while the Austrians withdrew to Villafranca. In this first clash of the war, Colonel Alessandro La Marmora, founder of the Bersaglieri, was seriously wounded.

On 9 April, the Piedmontese took control of the bridge at Monzambano to the north. On 11 April, the Austrians finally abandoned the east bank of the Mincio and withdrew to Verona. The Piedmontese occupied Valeggio.

Further east, on 17 April, the new Austrian army under Nugent crossed the Isonzo with two goals: to reinforce Radetzky and to reoccupy Veneto. On 23 April, Nugent entered Udine. Meanwhile, on 26 April, half the Piedmontese army crossed the Mincio. Two days later, another two divisions crossed and the whole army was deployed in an arc to blockade Peschiera, which the Piedmontese began to besiege on 27 April, and to simultaneously threaten Verona. The disposition also threatened the Austrian army, arrayed along the Adige and the main road from Verona to Trento and Austria.

=== Piedmontese advance towards the Adige (30 April 1848) ===
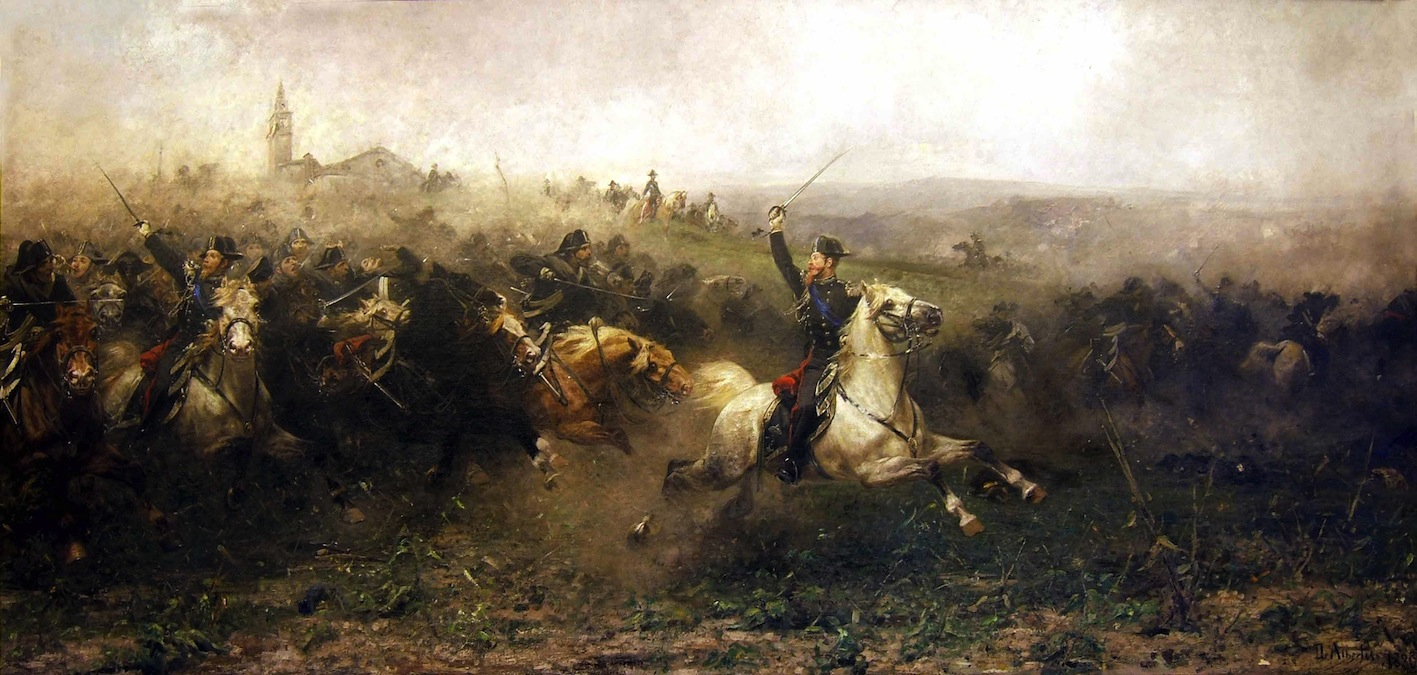
The charge of the Carabinieri at Pastrengo. Painting by Sebastiano De Albertis.

In the face of the Piedmontese threat, Radetzky had occupied an advance position at Pastrengo on the west bank of the Adige. On 30 April, the 2nd Army under De Sonnaz advanced to eliminate the enemy bridgehead (14,000 Piedmontese against 8,000 Austrians). For three hours, from 11 am until 2 pm, the advance was slow and difficult. Charles Albert, growing impatient, pushed forward with three squadrons of mounted carabinieri, between the Brigade "Cuneo" and Brigade "Piemonte". At that moment, the Piedmontese advance revived and some carabinieri came under Austrian fire. After a moment of confusion, Major Alessandro Negri di Sanfront spurred on the three squadrons of carabinieri against the enemy, with the King and his bodyguard joining the charge. The Austrian line was broken; the Piedmontese infantry forced the enemy to retreat.

Having reached the Adige, the Piedmontese were stopped by Radetzky, who had responded to the enemy advance with an attack on the centre of the Piedmontese formation. The attack was easily parried but succeeded in diverting Charles Albert from attempting to cross the Adige. The Skirmish of Pastrengo thus ended in a Piedmontese victory which raised the morale of the Savoyard troops, but their success in eliminating the Austrian bridgehead was incomplete since the east bank of the Adige remained firmly under Radetzky's control.

=== Withdrawal of the Papal States ===
In this situation, Pope Pius IX gave an address to the Papal consistory, meeting on 29 April 1848, in which he disavowed his army's invasion of Veneto. The change of position resulted from the impossibility of fighting a major Catholic power like Austria. Pius feared the possibility of a schism with the Austrian Catholics, declaring, "We have learnt also that some enemies of the Catholic religion have taken this opportunity to inflame the minds of the Germans against the unity of this Holy See."

The Papal troops and their commander, Giovanni Durando, ignored the wishes of the Pope and continued the campaign, but the impact of Pius' action was considerable. Report of the speech reached the Piedmontese general staff on 2 May, producing great concern. Charles Albert was most affected of all by it, writing to minister Ottavio Thaon di Revel, "The Pope's speech is an act which could have immense consequences. Certainly, it will do damage to the cause of Italian independence."

=== Battle of Santa Lucia (6 May 1848) ===
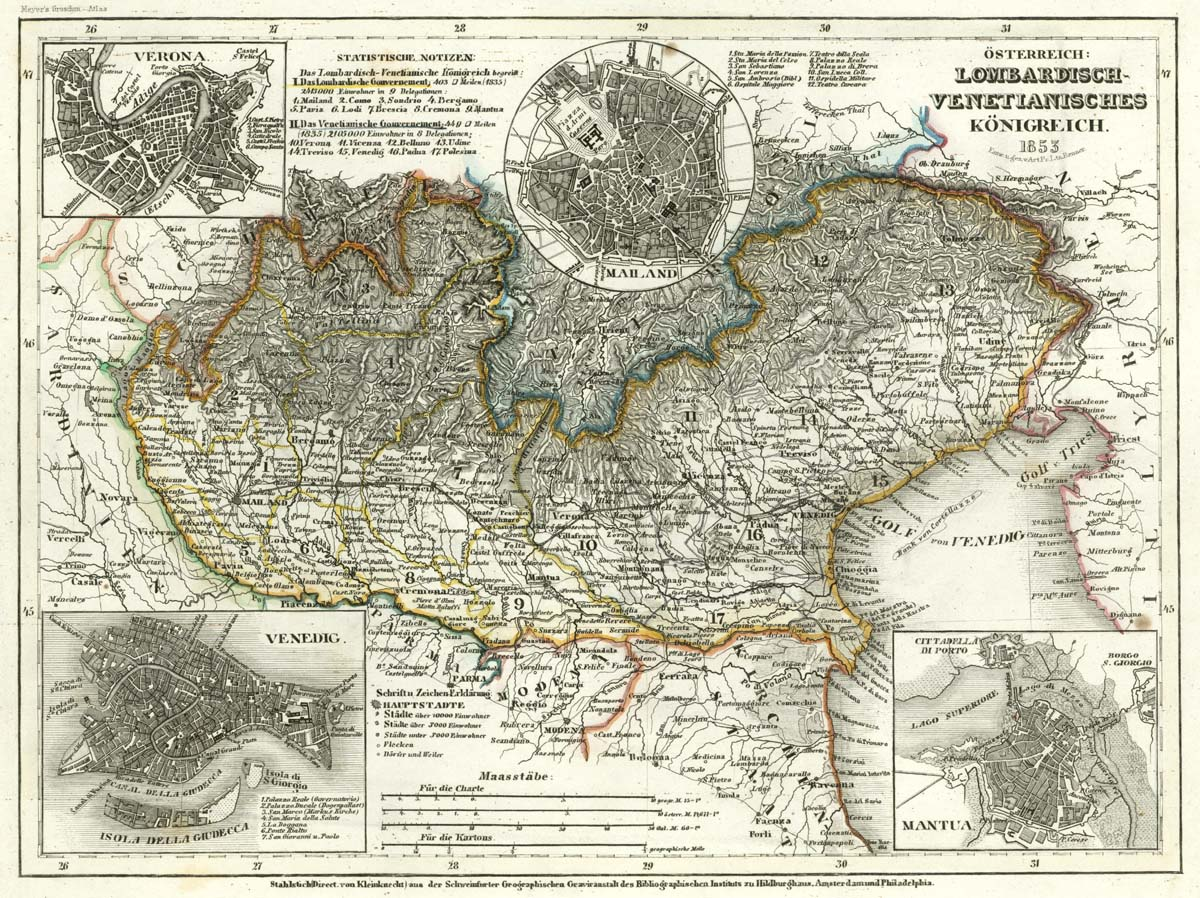
The Austrian Kingdom of Lombardy–Venetia, theatre of operations for the first campaign of the war

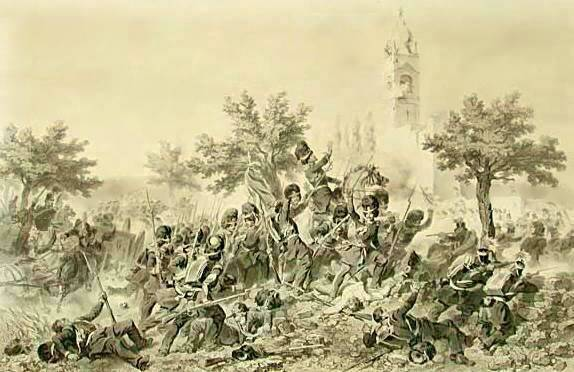
The Battle of Santa Lucia. The Piedmontese grenadiers attack and are opposed by effectively stationed Austrian forces.

As a result of Pastrengo, Charles Albert had brought his left-wing up to the Adige. Now he sought to push the Austrians back to Verona with a spectacular battle, so that he could announce a brilliant success in time for the start of the new session of the Chamber of Deputies. The army he faced was divided into three parts: the first on the east bank of the Adige up to Pastrengo to the north, the second in the villages west of Verona, and the third part inside the walls of Verona itself.

It seemed to the Piedmontese that they could pretty easily defeat the Austrian forces in front of Verona, ignoring or underestimating the fact that the villages had been skillfully and systematically fortified by the Austrians. At Charles Albert's request, General Bava prepared a plan, which was then modified by Franzini, for an "armed reconnaissance" in the direction of Verona in order to provoke a battle in the open. The 1st Army, the reserve division and the 3rd Division of the 2nd Army (i.e. 4/5 of the whole Piedmontese army) were to take part in the attack, whose principal target was the village of San Massimo. On 6 May 1848, the Piedmontese army began its advance. The movement of the various units was not synchronised. At the village of San Massimo, where the main attack was to be concentrated, the Brigade "Re" from the 1st Division of the 1st Army came under heavy enemy fire. The other brigade in its division, the Brigade "Aosta", also encountered heavy fire in front of the village of Santa Lucia, which became the focus of the Piedmontese assault, as a result, the breakdown of the plan of attack.

Since Charles Albert was in an exposed forward position, General Bava contravened the plan which required him to wait for the other units and attacked Santa Lucia at 10 am with the Brigade "Aosta", exposing it to intense Austrian fire. Only at 11 am, did the Guards Brigade from the reserve division arrive to assist. With this, he was able to flank the village. Parts of the Brigade "Re" and the 2nd Division of the 1st Army began to arrive between 12 and 1:30 pm, at which point Bava launched an assault, which was focused on the cemetery of Santa Lucia, doggedly defended by the Austrians. However, the latter were overcome by the enemy and eventually had to abandon their positions and withdraw to Verona.

The Piedmontese stalled rather than taking advantage of the situation. At 2pm they received notice that the 3rd Division of the 2nd Piedmontese Army's attack on the hamlets of Croce Bianca and Chievo had failed. The news led Charles Albert to order a retreat. Simultaneously, an energetic Austrian counter-offensive was launched, in which Radetzky's men made it to Santa Lucia, which they found abandoned by the Piedmontese. At 6 pm the battle was over. The Austrians had rebuffed the enemy attack, suffering 72 dead, 190 wounded, and 87 captured. The Piedmontese had lost 110 men and suffered 776 wounded. The failure marked the loss of Piedmontese initiative, which now passed to the Austrians.

== Arrival of Austrian reinforcements ==
=== The Crossing of the Soča (17–29 April 1848) ===
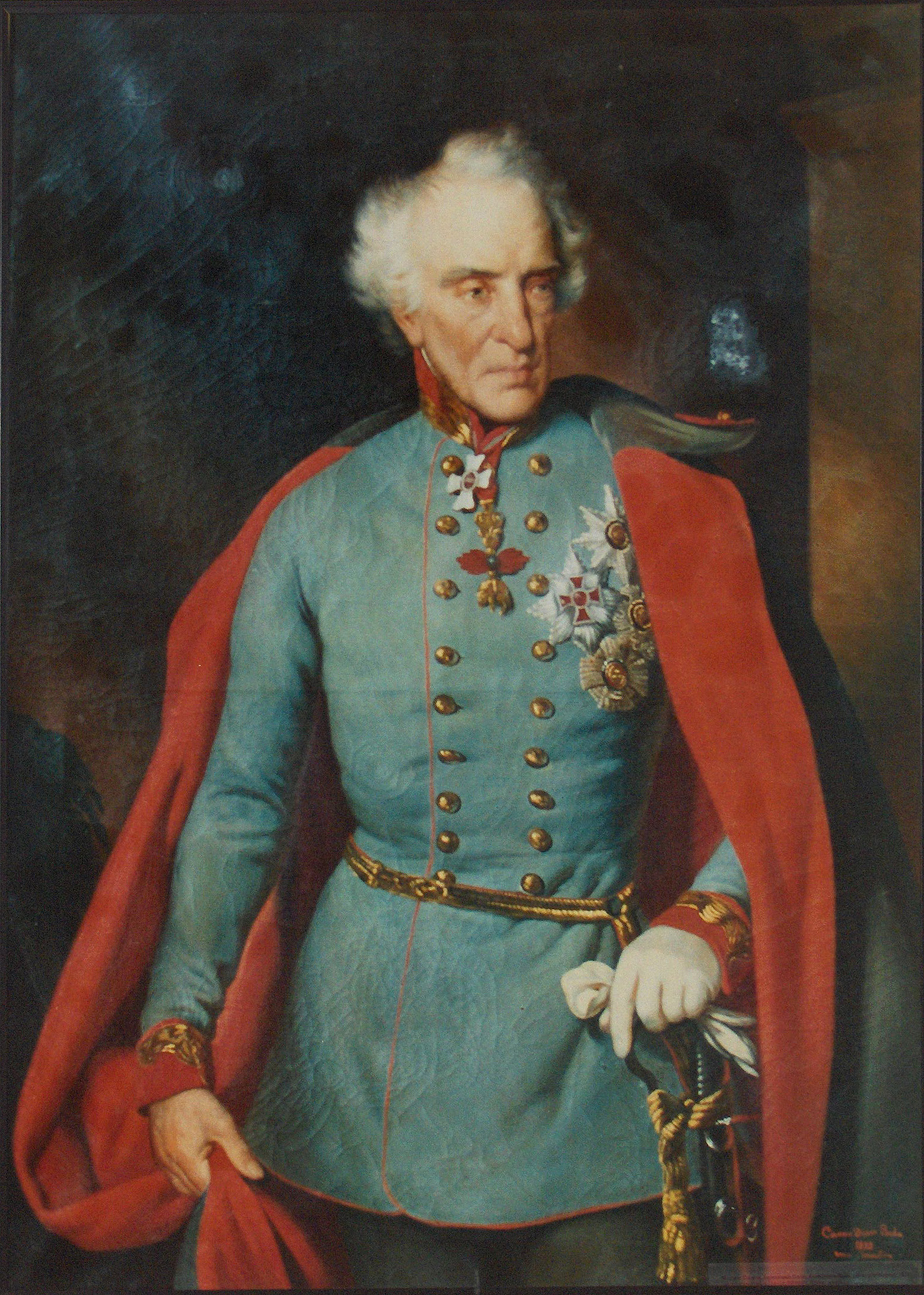
The Austrian general Laval Nugent, who led the Austrian reinforcements from the Soča to the Piave

While Charles Albert was fighting in the Quadrilateral, another conflict took place in parallel in Veneto, which remained completely separate from the Piedmontese campaign. The government of the Republic of San Marco barely managed to keep the various local committees co-ordinated. Searching for a commander to organise their troops, they obtained the Piedmontese general Alberto La Marmora.

On the other side, the Austrian general Laval Nugent von Westmeath concentrated his forces at Görz and crossed the Soča into Veneto on 17 April 1848 with 12–13,000 men. He substantially outnumbered the forces opposing his passage. That same day, Nugent locked down Palmanova, moving on to Udine which surrendered on 22 April after an artillery bombardment. On 23 April, the Austrians occupied the city. Nugent then moved on towards Tagliamento.

La Marmora had just 1,300 men at the river against the Austrian force, which had grown to 16–17,000 men. After destroying a bridge, he decided to withdraw west to the Piave. Meanwhile, Giovanni Durando crossed over the Po and arrived at Ostiglia on 23 April with the 10–11,000 Papal regulars, while Andrea Ferrari was also on the way with volunteers and the Papal national guard (7,000 men). Durando and his men proceeded to Treviso on 29 April, while La Marmora was ordered to defend eastern Venetia. Pius IX's order to withdraw was made the same day, but Durando and the troops chose to ignore it.

=== Battle of Cornuda (8 May 1848) ===
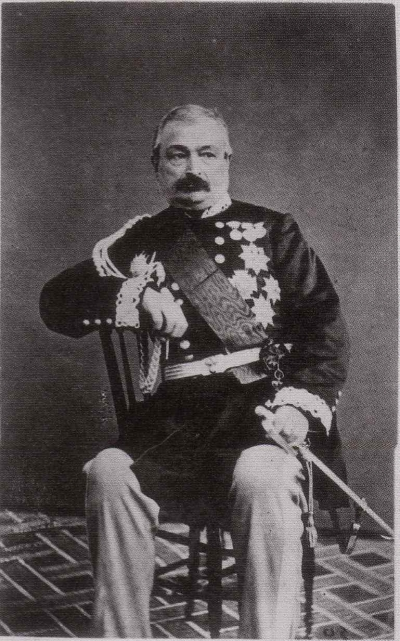
General Giovanni Durando, commander of the ex-Papal regulars

In the north, the Austrians entered Belluno on 5 May and on 6 May a brigade crossed the Piave at Feltre. Meanwhile, the first divisions of Ferrari's force arrived at Treviso. Convinced that the Austrians were advancing on Bassano del Grappa from the north, Durando stationed his troops there and arranged for Ferrari and his forces to be stationed near Montebelluna.

On the afternoon of 8 May, however, Nugent's vanguard of 1,000 men made contact with an advance force of Ferrari, 300 men stationed at Onigo, which was 10 km northwest of Montebelluna. Ferrari pulled back a little bit to Cornuda hill, the last natural obstacle between the enemy and the plain. On the morning of 9 May, the battle began anew: 2,000 Austrians with 6 cannons attacked the Papal troops, who had not yet received any reinforcements from Ferrari or Durando. The latter hesitated for some time before sending a note at 12:30pm, saying "Vengo correndo" (I'm coming in a hurry).

While Nugent further reinforced his soldiers, Ferrari sent a battalion to his men from Montebelluna and ordered 50 dragoons to charge the Austrians in order to buy some time. They were nearly all killed, but they managed to stall the Austrian advance. Subsequently, the Austrians received further reinforcements and began to turn about from Feltre towards Cornuda. There were now 6,000 Austrian troops facing 2,000 very tired Papal soldiers, who were in danger of being surrounded. At 5pm, after the battle had been going on for 12 hours without any reinforcements from Durando, Ferrari decided to order the troops to withdraw. The retreat was disordered and continued all the way to Treviso.

=== Austrian advance to Verona (9–25 May 1848) ===
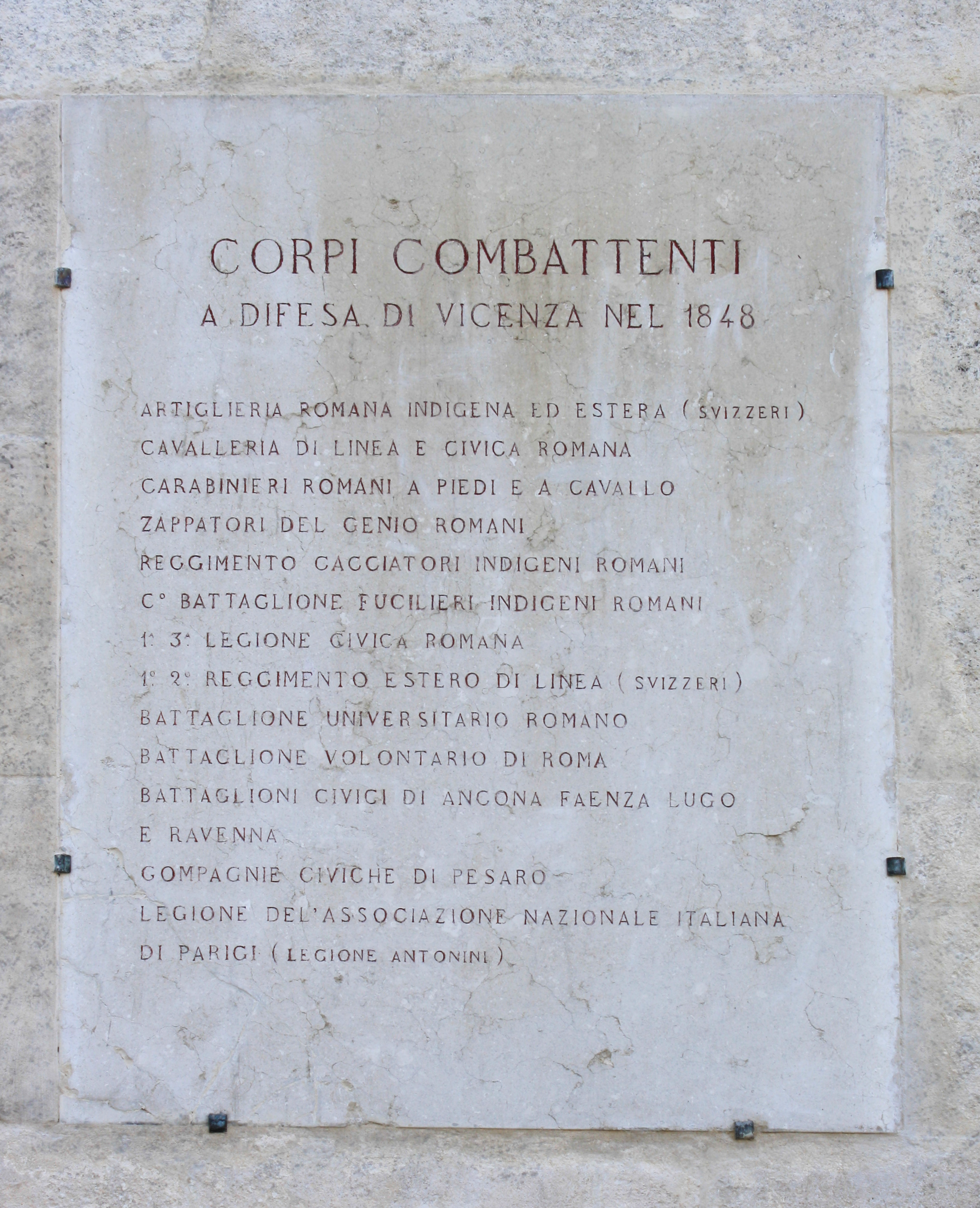
Commemorative plaque for the troops who fought at Vicenza in 1848

After the Battle of Cornuda, the situation in Veneto was very grave for the Italians. However, Josef Radetzky insisted that Nugent immediately bring his forces to Verona in order to join up with his army. But on 17 May, the aggravation of an old wound forced Nugent to hand command of his forces over to General Georg Thurn Valsassina. On 18 May, with no more than 4,000 men in the field, Durando returned to Treviso with a few units to defend it from the Austrians. Thurn took advantage of the withdrawal of Durando's troops from Piazzola in order to cross the river Brenta and attack Vicenza, which repelled the attack. There were 5,000 men defending the city, mostly Papal forces. They were reinforced by forces from various parts of Veneto, forces from Durando and the battalion of General Giacomo Antonini, a member of Young Italy who had recruited a diverse group of volunteers in France.

On 22 May, Radetzky changed his mind about the urgency of linking up the forces in light of the changed situation after the Battle of Santa Lucia and ordered Thurn to attack Vicenza again, which now contained 11,000 men in addition to the National Guard and the citizens. The battle took place between the night of 23 May and the morning of 24 May. The Austrians attacked the city from the west but were blocked by flooding caused by the defenders who resisted and counter-attacked tenaciously. An Austrian force sent via the Berici Hills and no better luck. At 9 am Thurn ordered a retreat to Verona. Thurn's forces finally met up with Radetzky's on 25 May 1848.

== The second phase of the first campaign (May–August 1848) ==
=== Ferdinand leaves the war ===
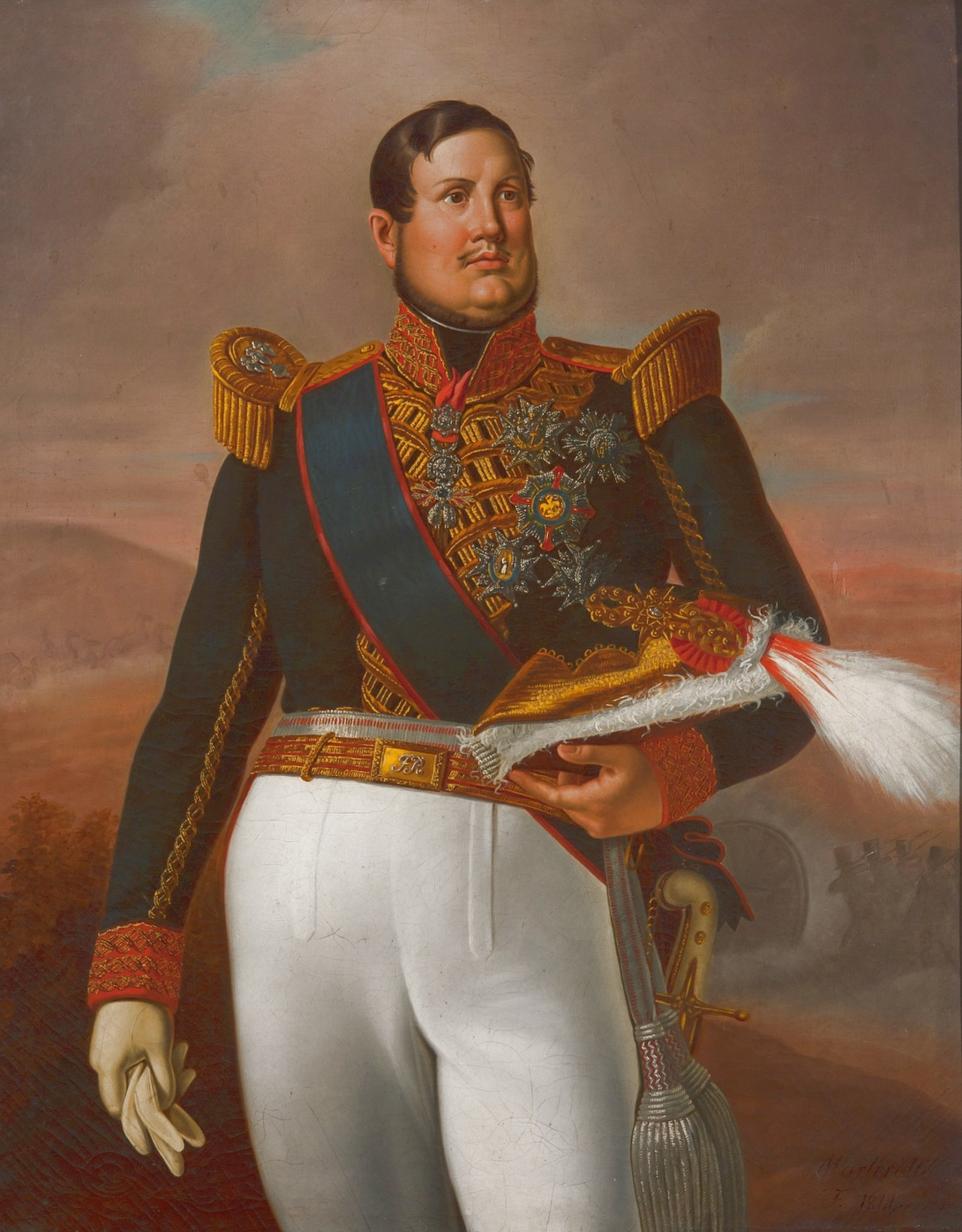
Ferdinand II abandoned the campaign against Austria in order to settle the revolution in Sicily.

Simultaneously, in Naples, Ferdinand II decided, as a result of riots in the capital on 15 May, to withdraw from the war – before his troops had even encountered the enemy. This decision arose from political considerations (such as the failure to form an Italian League), the departure of Pope Pius IX from the war, and the need to reconquer Sicily, which had declared itself an independent state, the Kingdom of Sicily.

On 21 May 1848, a few hours after the departure of the first brigade of the Neapolitan expedition from Bologna to Ferrara, the commander of the troops, Guglielmo Pepe, received the order to return immediately to the Kingdom of the Two Sicilies.

Despite the resistance of General Pepe, the withdrawal was inevitable. Only a single body of the Bourbon expedition remained, the 10th Regiment "Abruzzo", which had already linked up with the Piedmontese troops. This regiment withdrew to Naples after the Battle of Goito.

In Romagna, the decision was not easy for the various Bourbon officials. The case of Colonel Carlo Francesco Lahalle was particularly dramatic – split between his duty to his king and his ideals, he committed suicide. In this context, a small portion of the Neapolitan forces under the leadership of Pepe and a group of young officers including Luigi Mezzacapo, Carlo Mezzacapo, Enrico Cosenz, Cesare Rosaroll, Girolamo Calà Ulloa, and others, arrived in Venice, where they contributed to the Republic of San Marco's war effort until the end of the conflict.

=== Battle of Curtatone and Montanara (29 May 1848) ===
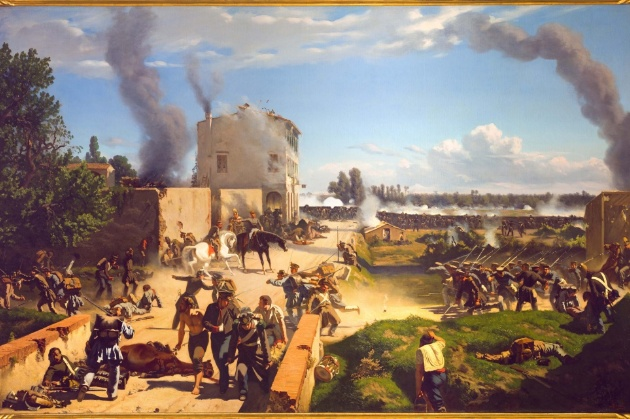
The battle of Curtatone and Montanara, during which the Tuscan and Neapolitan volunteers defended the Italian formation. Painting by Pietro Senna.

On 25 May 1848 at Verona, Thurn's forces reached Radetzky's forces and the reunited army left the city two days later. The plan was to outflank the Piedmontese army from the south, raise the siege of Pescheria, and obtain a decisive victory. Charles Albert's army was marshalled against him, along both banks of the River Mincio, from Pescheria to Mantua. Radetzky decided to begin the manoeuvre as soon as he was out of Mantua, near Curtatone and Montanara – the weak point in the Piedmontese lines. At this location, there were 5,400 troops, including Tuscan and Neapolitans, made up of volunteers and members of the 2nd battalion of the 10th Regiment "Abruzzo", who had not yet received the news of Ferdinand's withdrawal from the war.

The Austrian army left Verona on the morning of 27 May with a contingent of 45,000 men in three columns, commanded by Eugen Wratislaw von Mitrowitz (1st Corps), Konstantin d'Aspre (2nd Corps) and Gustav Wocher (reserve). The army reached Mantua the next day. Alarmed, the Piedmontese general staff arranged for a concentration of forces at Goito. On 29 May at 1pm, the Austrians crossed the Mincio in a number of columns. One of these headed for Governolo (15 km southeast of Mantua on the Mincio) to face the Parmans and Modenese. Another two columns attacked the nearby settlements of Curtatone and Montanara, and a fourth column attacked the nearby village of San Silvestro in order to outflank the Tuscans and Neapolitans from the south.

The three columns converging on Curtatone, Montanara and San Silvestro contained some 20,000 soldiers in all and 52 cannons. Curtatone was defended by 2,500 men under the Piedmontese colonel Campia, Montanara by 2,300 under the Lucian colonel Giuseppe Giovannetti. The rest of the men were in reserve positions. The attack was launched by the Austrians at Curtatone around 10:30. Initially rebuffed, the attack was renewed with artillery fire, and then rebuffed again. At Montanara, there was fierce fighting and the front line of the defenders was not broken until around 2pm. After 2pm, the attack was renewed at Curtatone too; the defenders remained firm in the centre but collapsed at the sides and after 4pm, general Cesare De Laugier de Bellecour, commander of the Tuscan division, ordered a retreat, which marked the end of the battle.

The Tuscans and Neapolitans had suffered 166 dead, 518 wounded, and 1,178 captured. The Austrians had suffered 95 dead, 516 wounded and 178 deserters. Despite being defeated, the battle had given the Piedmontese command time to bring in reinforcements to the south and to prepare for the planned Austrian attack on Goito, a few kilometres away.

=== The insurrection in Cadore ===
In Cadore, from 29 April 1848 for over a month, a small armed rebellion of around 4,000 poorly armed men clashed with hostile forces sent from Austria to Belluno, where they were meant to link up with the forces of Nugent. Pietro Fortunato Calvi was sent to the rebels by the Republic of San Marco to lead the men, but in May they were attacked from the south by General Karl Freiherr von Culoz and other forces which far outnumbered the rebels, until the rebellion was finally suppressed around 6–9 June and Calvi had to retreat to Venice.

=== The Battle of Goito and the fall of Peschiera (30 May 1848) ===
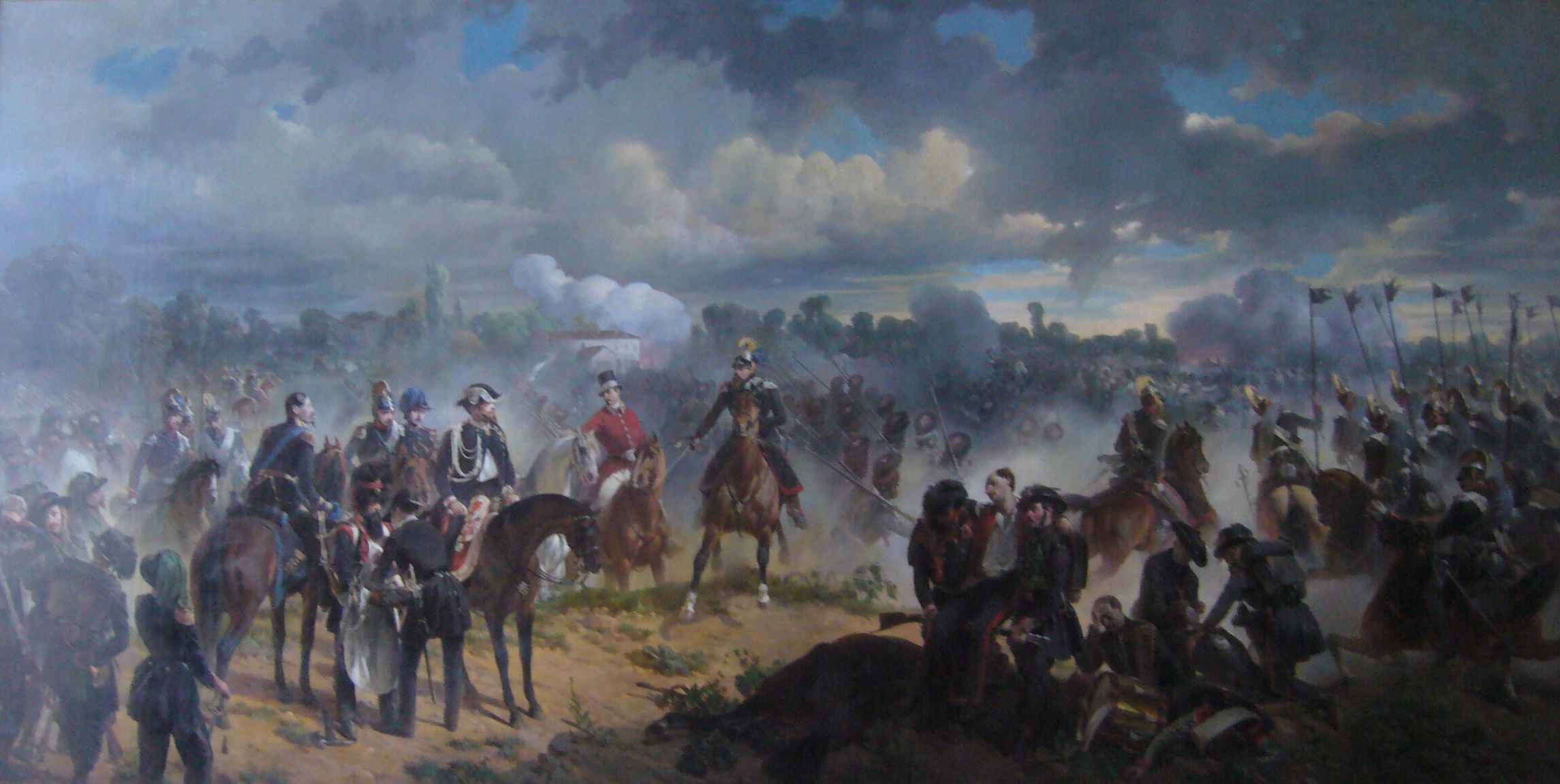
The moment of the Piedmontese counterattack at the Battle of Goito, seen from the rear. Painted by Felice Cerruti Bauduc (1817–1896).

After the victories at Curtatone and Montanara, Radetzky split his forces into two columns: Wratislaw's 1st Corps and a reserve force under Wocher (a total of 26,000 men) were sent north towards Goito; D'Aspre's 2nd Corps (14,000 men) were sent northwest through Rodigo and Ceresara, towards Guidizzolo and Medole. This was intended to out-flank the Piedmontese army on the Mincio, which was spread out between Valeggio, Volta, and Goito.

On the other side, the Piedmontese scouts did not report a rapid advance of the enemy and Bava, who was in command of the 1st Corps, which was the most exposed to an attack from the south, decided to concentrate his forces near Goito. At 3pm on 30 May he had stationed 21 battalions of infantry, 23 squadrons of cavalry, and 56 Piedmontese cannons, as well as a battalion of the Neapolitan 10th Regiment "Abruzzo" and a thousand Tuscans, in the area.

Half an hour later, the 1st Austrian Corps began its attack on the 1st Piedmontese Corps. The right-wing of the Austrians, next to the River Mincio, advanced very quickly and was targeted by the Italian artillery. The centre overwhelmed the Piedmontese front line but was not able to overcome the sustained counterattack of the Piedmontese second line and also came under artillery fire. Fresh Austrian forces were sent in support but were insufficient. Then Radetzky, who had lost contact with his 2nd Corps, ordered his troops to withdraw. Two Piedmontese cavalry charges helped make the Austrian withdrawal more like a retreat. The battle was over by 7pm. The Italians had suffered 43 dead and 253 wounded, the Austrians 68 dead, 331 wounded, and 223 fled.

Radetzky's grand strategic manoeuvre had failed. He had only managed to bring 14 battalions into contact with the enemy, keeping the cavalry inactive. Further, at the moment of the final Piedmontese counterattack, Charles Albert had received news that the fortress of Peschiera had been taken, and a little after this, the Austrian retreat at Goito was announced. The news of the double victory was greeted by those who were present with cheers of "Long live the King of Italy!".

=== Austrian conquest of Vicenza (5–11 June 1848) ===
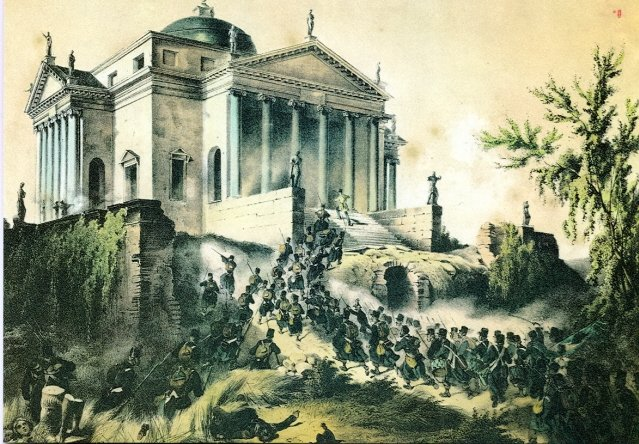
The Austrians occupy the Villa Capra "La Rotonda" during the Battle of Monte Berico.

After the battle of Goito and the surrender of Peschiera, Radetzky did not retreat to Verona. Instead, on 5 June 1848, he moved on Vicenza. The forces employed for the attack were the 1st and 2nd Corps and two brigades of the 3rd Corps (the former reserve Corps). Radetzky advanced from the south, intending to occupy the Berici Hills which dominate the southern approach of the city. Vicenza was defended by a total of 11,000 men, consisting of ex-Papal troops under general Durando and volunteers.

An Austrian army of 30,000 men and 124 cannons advanced on Vicenza in a crescent formation stretching from the south to the east. The distant commanders of the Piedmontese army did not take any action, confident that the city would be able to resist for several days.

Radetzky attacked with the 1st Corps, intending to occupy the hilly area to the south of the city. At dawn on 10 June, the Austrian vanguard encountered the advance forces of the Italians. To the east of the city, the 2nd Austrian Corps met strong resistance, but the crux of the battle turned out to be the south, near the Villa Capra "La Rotonda", where the Austrian 1st Corps managed to defeat the Roman volunteers. Around 2pm, the defenders launched a counter-attack that failed, in which Colonel Enrico Cialdini was seriously wounded. Around 5pm, the outer defenses of Vicenza withdrew to the basilica, with two Austrian brigades on their heels and Colonel Massimo d'Azeglio was wounded.

After sending the reserves into the battle, with almost no success, Durando decided that the battle was lost and made a proclamation at 7pm, declaring that it was necessary to surrender, despite the opposition of many of the citizens. The Austrians started negotiations, allowing the ex-Papal troops to withdraw south of the Po, so long as they stayed out of the fighting for three months. The next day, 11 June, around 9,000 defenders departed from Vicenza. The Italian casualties amounted to 293 dead and 1,665 wounded, while on the Austrian side 141 were dead, 541 wounded, and 140 had deserted.

=== Extension of the Front (June–July 1848) ===
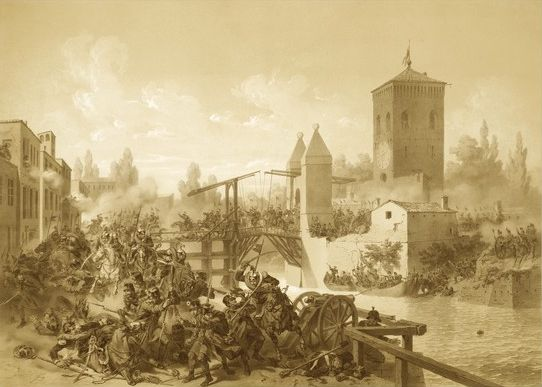
The Battle of Governolo, seen from the Piedmontese side. Contemporary French lithograph.

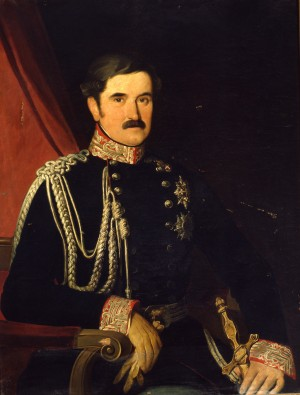
Eusebio Bava, commander of the Piedmontese 1st Army Corps

The conquest of Vicenza removed the troops of General Durando from the Veneto and led to the fall of Padua and Treviso on 13 June, and then Palmanova on 24 June.

On learning of the Austrian attack on Vicenza on 8 June, Charles Albert held a council of war. Franzini wanted to take advantage of the situation to make an immediate assault on Verona, but the council decided instead to attack Peschiera from the northeast and to occupy Rivoli Veronese. The memory of the Battle of Santa Lucia was still very fresh.

Thus, on 10 June, while the majority of the Austrian army was concentrated at Vicenza, the Piedmontese 2nd Corps advanced on the plain of Rivoli, site of Napoleon's 1797 victory over the Austrians. Radetzky's men withdrew, allowing the Piedmontese to reach their objective. The occupation of Rivoli strengthened the left wing of the Piedmontese formation, but was a bad move for the war effort as a whole since it left them over-extended.

After Rivoli and various failed attempts to regain the initiative, there was another month of inactivity on the Piedmontese side, during which the blockade of Mantua was begun. Meanwhile, Charles Albert considered an attack across the Adige and relocated from Valeggio sul Mincio to Roverbella. On 4 July he met with Giuseppe Garibaldi, who had returned from South America where he had been in exile after being condemned to death for his part in the uprising of 1834. The King greeted him icily and referred him to Franzini, writing that it would have been dishonorable to give the rank of general to such a man.

Meanwhile, at the front, after an attempt to reinforce and resupply the garrison at Ferrara, an Austrian brigade occupied Governolo (southeast of Mantua, at the confluence of the Mincio and the Po) on 16 July, leaving five companies there and then withdrawing to the Quadrilateral. Eusebio Bava, who had been left with a brigade to counter any further Austrian raids, decided to attack Governolo. On 18 July, he initiated a lively fire of fusiliers and artillery from the Mincio, when a Bersaglieri company traveled up the river, attacked the Austrians on the left bank, and managed to lower the drawbridge. The Piedmontese cavalry immediately crossed over, followed by the artillery, prompting the Austrians to retreat – 400 were captured.

The Battle of Governolo was a brilliant victory for the Savoyard forces, but they were now stretched out over 70 km, from Rivoli to Governolo. This line was very weak as a line of resistance and weak at every point.

=== Battle of Custoza (22–27 July 1848) ===
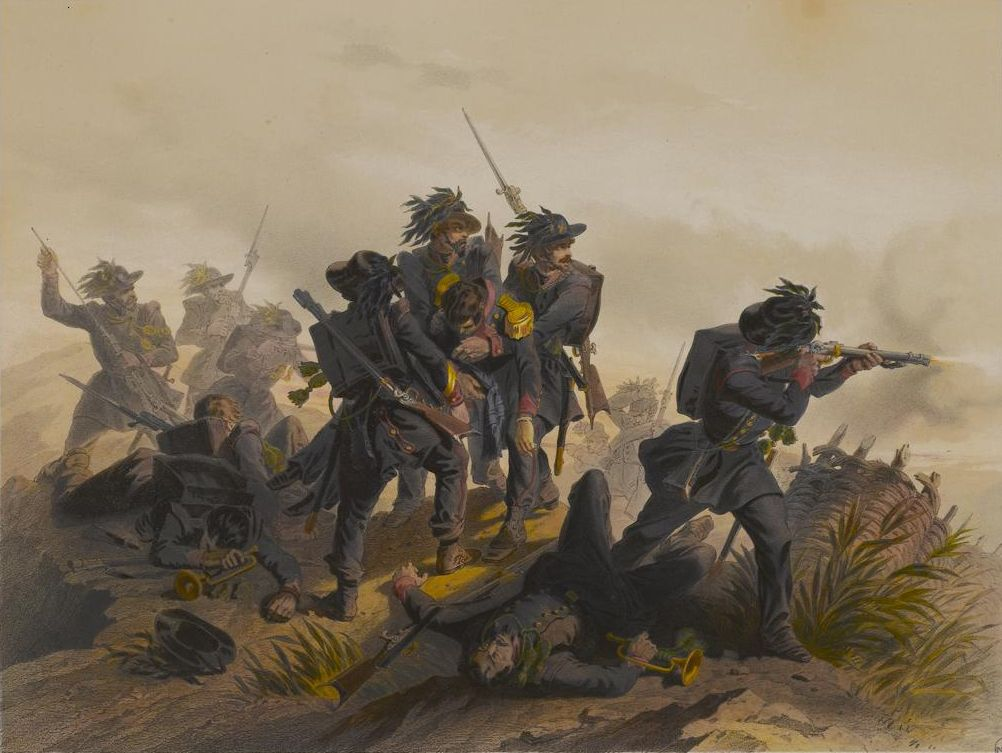
Bersaglieri face the Austrian attack at Rivoli, 22 July 1848

The armies facing each other along the long front line on 20 July 1848 were nearly equal in size: 75,000 men on the Italian side, 76,000 on the Austrian side. The front line of the Piedmontese army was divided into two groups: one near Mantua and one near the Adige, facing Verona, where the Austrian forces were concentrated.

==== Beginning of the Austrian offensive ====
At dawn on 22 July 1848, the Austrian 3rd Corps of Thurn attacked from the north of Rivoli, at the extreme left of the Piedmontese formation. They were met by the forces of de Sonnaz from the south, which stood firm and then counterattacked.

However, at 7:30 on 23 July, Radetzky launched a massive attack on the Mincio between Sona and Sommacampagna. The 1st and 2nd Corps led the advance and encountered a tenacious but doomed resistance. By noon, the Austrians had gained the strongpoints that the Italians had been holding for the last three months or so. Thus, in the afternoon of 23 July, the 2nd Army Corps of de Sonnaz was all in retreat. In the evening almost all of them gathered at Cavalcaselle, a little east of Peschiera.

At 4pm on 23 July, the Austrians cautiously crossed the Mincio at Salionze (between Peschiera and Monzambano). The next morning they defeated the troops of de Sonnaz, which were very tired from the march, once more.

In the afternoon of 24 July, the Austrians occupied the crossings over the Mincio at Salionze, Monzambano, and Veleggio. Simultaneously, at 4:30pm, Piedmontese forces under Bava returned to the left bank of the Mincio from Mantua and attacked the left flank of the Austrian advance force. The battle took place at Staffalo, between Sommacampagna and Custoza, whose high points were all occupied by the Piedmontese. In his efforts to cross the Mincio quickly, Radetzky thus came under threat on both banks, but as soon as he noticed the situation, he recalled the columns that had already crossed the river.

==== Failure of the Piedmontese counterattack ====
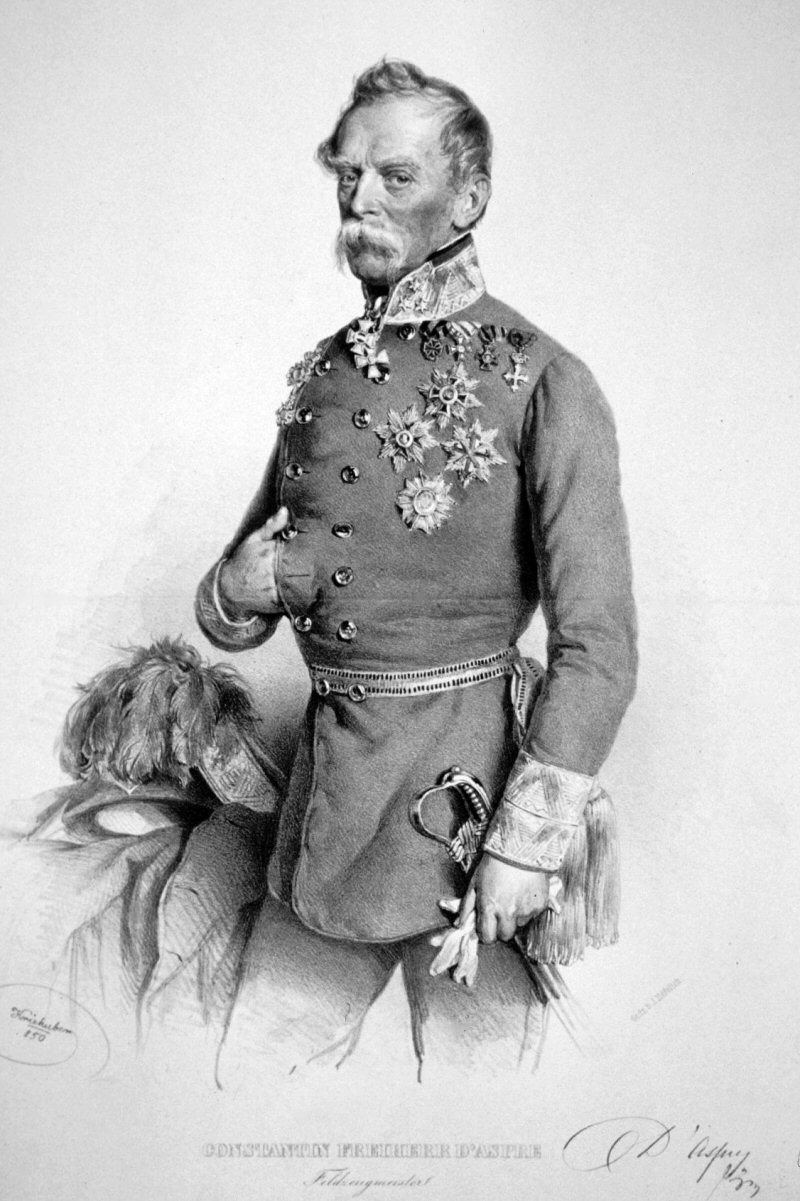
Konstantin d'Aspre, commander of the Austrian 2nd Corps

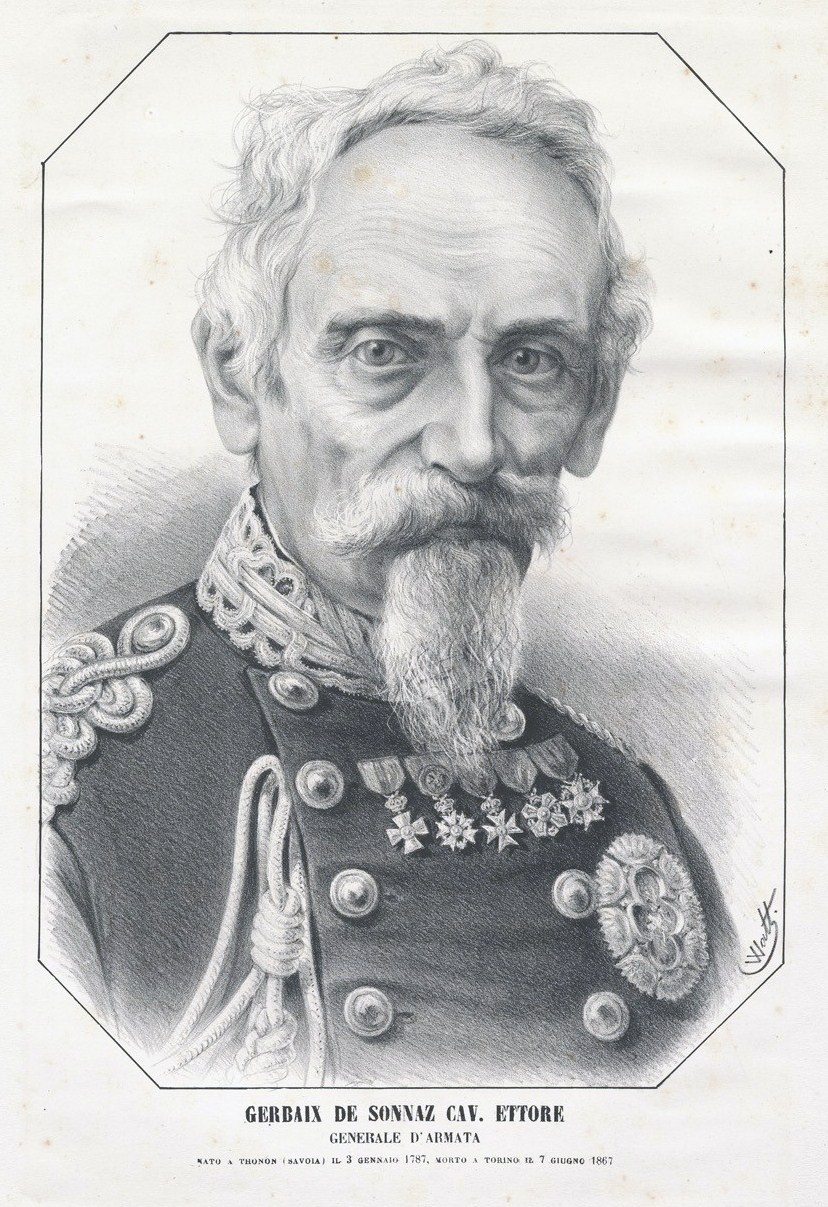
Ettore De Sonnaz, commander of the Piedmontese 2nd Corps

The Piedmontese command organised an offensive by the 1st Corps towards Mincio on 25 July, in order to make contact with the 2nd Corps on the right bank and cut the supply line to the Austrians from the Quadrilateral.

However, Radetzky foresaw the Piedmontese action, turned around at Valeggio and attacked the Piedmontese for the northwest at Custoza and Sommacampagna. The 20,000 Italians on the spot were met by 40,000 Austrians. Radetzky was, therefore, able to split the forces of Charles Albert and defeat de Sonnaz before moving on to defeat Bava.

On 25 July, at Valeggio, at 11am, the Piedmontese offensive began and was soon stalled by an energetic counter-offensive. On the right bank of the Mincio, there was no sign of the 2nd Corps of de Sonnaz, which had not arrived at the ordained time.

East of the Mincio (on the left bank), Bava's forces were now split on the Valeggio-Sommacapagna line (southwest-northeast). Between 11am and 12:30pm, the Duke of Genoa at Sommacampagna (the right-wing) rebuffed three Austrian assaults, but at 1:30pm, after another attack by the 2nd Austrian Corps, he had to retreat to Staffalo and Custoza.

Charles Albert then ordered de Sonnaz, who had been asked not to intervene until 6pm, to come from Goito with part of his force, leaving the rest at Volta Mantovana with orders not to abandon their station except in extreme emergency situations. But de Sonnaz, discouraged by the events of the previous day, abandoned Volta too at midnight, without a fight.

At 4pm, near Valeggio (the Piedmontese left-wing) further assaults of the Austrian 1st Corps took place. The battle revived in the centre as well as on the Piedmontese right-wing, the Duke of Genoa was in danger of being outflanked, so at 5:30 pm, he ordered a retreat to Villafranca.

With the left and right wings of the Piedmontese formation in retreat, the centre came under renewed attack at 6:30 pm and was forced to withdraw to Custoza. At 7:30 pm, after a final Austrian assault, it withdrew towards the Po river. Thus ended the Battle of Custoza on 25 July 1848, with 212 dead, 657 wounded, and 270 captured on the Italian side and 175 dead, 723 wounded, and 422 captured or deserted on the Austrian side.

==== Volta Mantovana ====
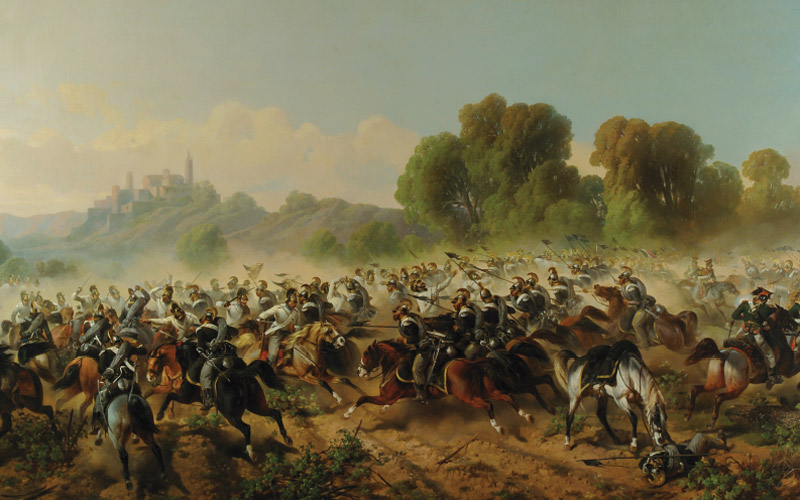
The charge of the Regiment "Genova Cavalleria" at Volta Mantovana on 27 July 1848. Painting by Felice Cerruti Bauduc, 1858.

Having been beaten at Custoza, at 10pm on 25 July 1848, Charles Albert sent orders to Bava for a general retreat to Goito. An hour and a half later, he sent an order to De Sonnaz to hold firm at Volta and hold the enemy at the Mincio. De Sonnaz had probably already decided to abandon Volta at this point and only received the order when he arrived at Goito at 5am on 26 July. At noon Charles Albert ordered him to return to Volta with the 3rd Division. At 6pm Austrians and Piedmontese clashed in what would become the opening phase of the battle of Volta Mantovana.An Austrian advance guard, which had occupied Volta in the meanwhile, came under attack from De Sonnaz and resisted tenaciously. The combat lasted in the night and at 2am de Sonnaz ordered Piedmontese troops to withdraw until reinforcements arrived.

Meanwhile, Charles Albert abandoned the blockade of Mantua and sent a brigade to Volta, which led the Piedmontese assault on 27 July, which failed in the face of a massive Austrian counterattack. The pressure was so great that de Sonnaz already ordered them to retreat at 6am. They had withdrawn a couple of kilometres when the Austrian cavalry attempted to disrupt their retreat. In response, the Piedmontese cavalry made a number of charges which effectively rebuffed the Austrians. At 10 am, de Sonnaz's troops arrived in Goito. The Battle of Custoza was over.

=== The Piedmontese retreat towards Milan (27 July – 3 August 1848) ===
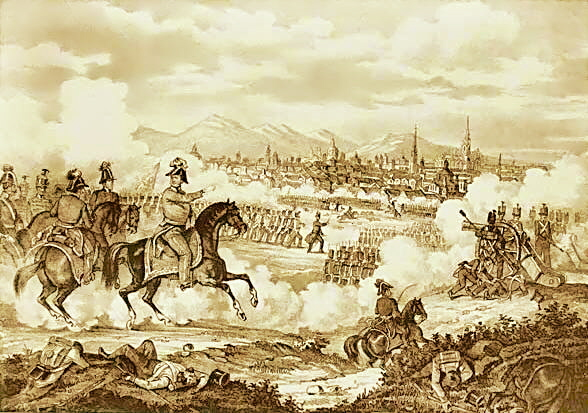
The Austrians approach Milan at the beginning of August 1848.

At 8 am on 27 July 1848, a council of war at Goito presided over by Charles Albert, decreed that it was necessary to open negotiations with the enemy for an eventual truce. A small Piedmontese delegation, which included colonel Alfonso Ferrero La Marmora, was sent to the Austrian camp. Eusebio Bava, however, gave orders to the troops to deploy to the north of Goito, but not all of them obeyed. Following the recent defeat, there were many instances of indiscipline and demoralisation. The general Claudio Seyssel d'Aix di Sommariva, a commandant of the 1st Division at Custoza, ignored the orders, disengaged and set off with the Brigade "Aosta" in a southerly direction, towards the lower course of the River Oglio, along with general Vittorio Garretti di Ferrere (commander of the 2nd Division), with the Brigade "Casale".

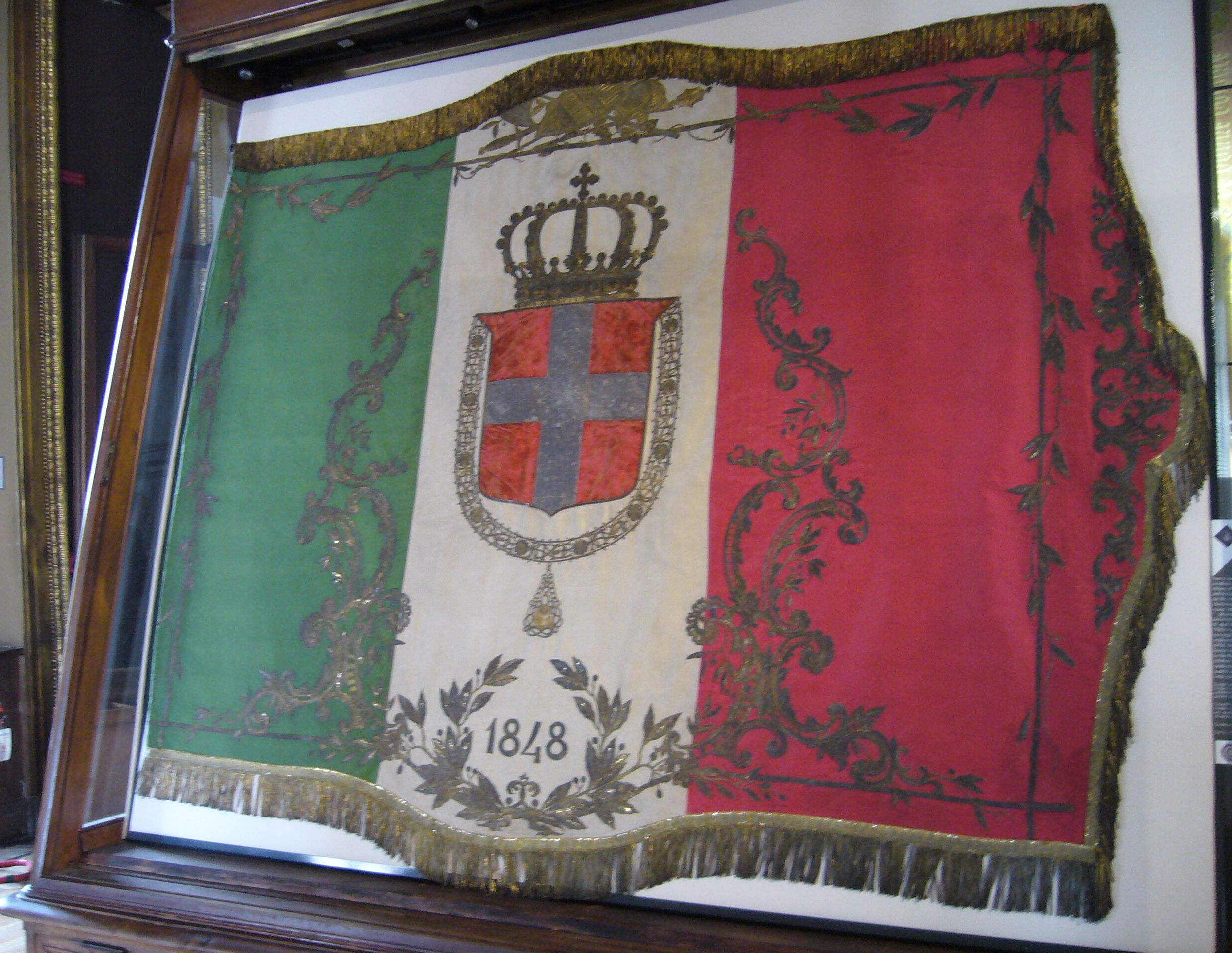
Flag donated by the women of Milan to Charles Albert in spring/summer 1848, on display in the Armeria Reale in Turin

In the afternoon, the delegation sent to the Austrian camp returned and reported that Radetzky was willing to allow a truce, on the condition that the Piedmontese withdraw their army to the Adda and return Pescheria, Venetia, Osoppo (still in Venetian hands at this point) and the duchies of Modena and Parma (the latter had voted for annexation by the Kingdom of Sardinia in the spring) to Austria. When he heard these conditions, Charles Albert exclaimed, "I would rather die!".

At 9pm, a general retreat towards the Oglio began and at 12 on 28 July, the Piedmontese army collected itself beyond the river. Bava realised that the Oglio was not a viable defensive position and after ten hours of break he continued the march to the west. The Austrians followed the Piedmontese since they did not want to lose contact and in order to give the impression of imminent danger, thereby speeding up the retreat and causing Charles Albert's troops to get strung out.

On 31 July 1848, the whole Piedmontese army had crossed the Adda and was ready to resist. But only one day later, at Crotta d'Adda, the defensive line was collapsing. In the zone of the 1st Division, in fact, the commandant Sommariva decided to abandon the right bank of the river, as a result of the impossibility of stationing artillery in the marshy land, a misunderstanding of the enemy's intentions and an overestimation of his own forces. Thus the Austrians were able to cross. Sommariva, who had already been responsible for the disengagement on 27 July, pulled back to Piacenza with all his forces, causing the isolation of the remainder.

At this point, the defensive line on the Adda was lost and against the wishes of almost all his generals, Charles Albert wanted to concentrate his whole army in Milan, so as not to lose the dynastic advantages that he had acquired there. The provisional government of Milan had actually voted in a referendum to accept annexation by Piedmont on 8 June. There was, however, the danger of the proclamation in Lombardy of a republic, which would likely be followed by a sustained intervention from the Second French Republic. This outcome would have been unwelcome for the Kingdom of Sardinia as much as for Austria.

The Piedmontese army marched north, reaching Lodi on 2 August, where the King relieved Sommariva and di Ferrere of their commands as a result of their actions over the preceding week. On 3 August, at 12 o'clock, the advance guard of the Piedmontese army reached the outskirts of Milan.

=== The surrender of Milan and the Salasco armistice (4 – 9 August 1848) ===
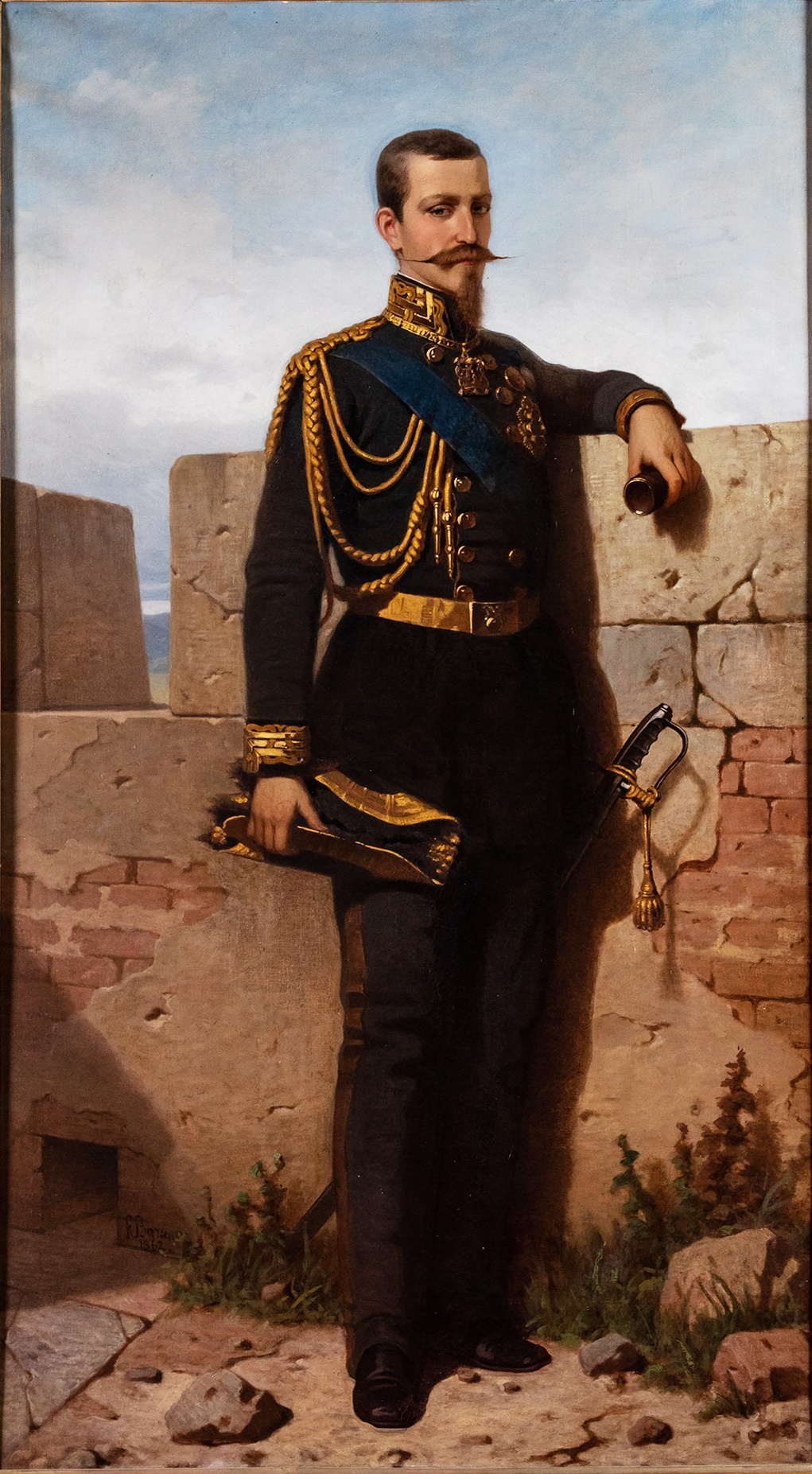
Prince Ferdinand distinguished himself in the conflict as commander of the 4th Piedmontese division.

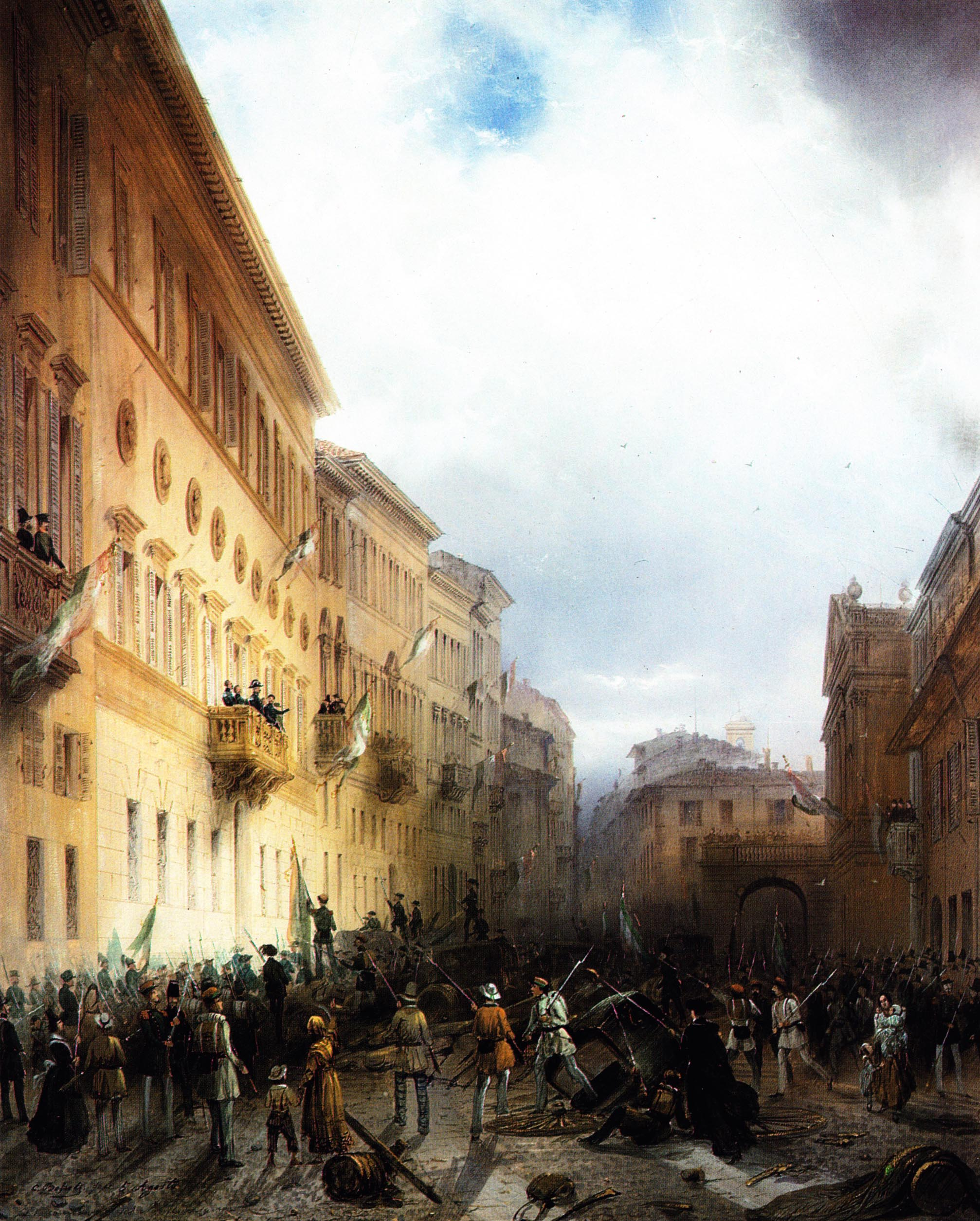
Charles Albert on the balcony of the Palazzo Greppi in Milan, attempts to calm the crowds protesting the armistice on 5 August 1848. Painting by Carlo Bossoli.

The Piedmontese were closely followed by the Austrians all the way and on 4 August 1848, in the area to the south of Milan, on the road to Melegnano, Radetzky began what would prove to be the final attack of the first campaign. The Piedmontese at first made a successful stand near Ca' Verde and at Nosedo, but then were forced to retreat from Cascina Pismonte. The brigade of General Mario Broglia attempted a counterattack – in vain since Bava had already decided to withdraw to the fortifications.

At 7pm, the retreat of the Piedmontese army within the walls of Milan was practically over. It had suffered 42 dead, 228 wounded and 142 captured in the day's fighting. The Austrians had lost 40 dead, 198 wounded, and 73 fled. A little after 8pm, Charles Albert called a council of war which decided to abandon the defense of the city because of the absence of munitions, food and cash. At 6am on 5 August, they were notified that Radetzky had accepted the requests of the Piedmontese: Milan would be ceded and in return Charles Albert's army would be allowed to retreat peacefully to Piedmont.

The population of Milan, however, expressed its strong opposition to this turn of events and called for the defense of the city to the death. At Palazzo Greppi, Charles Albert found himself besieged by a mob calling for the continued defense of the city. He appeared on the balcony for the first time and answered the questions of the people through an official. A little letter, he handed over the ratification of the armistice agreed by Carlo Canera di Salasco. Then Cesare Cantù convinced the King to go out again to calm the crowd, but someone fired a rifle and the King thus withdrew immediately.

That evening, Bersaglieri troops commanded by Alfonso La Marmora came to protect Charles Albert who now left Milan in a carriage, protected by soldiers. That night, the whole army began their retreat, followed by a crowd of exiles, which consisted of around a third of Milan's population. On 6 August, the army crossed the Ticino and that same day the Austrians entered Milan. Three days later, on 9 August, Radetzky and Salasco concluded an armistice which stated that Charles Albert's troops would withdraw from the whole of the Kingdom of Lombardy–Venetia.

Radetzky's victory was met with great emotion in Vienna, capital of an empire that was still troubled by revolutionary movements. For the occasion, the musician Johann Strauss composed the Radetzky March in honour of the victor and it was performed for the first time in Vienna at 31 August.

== Garibaldi's first command (30 July – 26 August 1848) ==
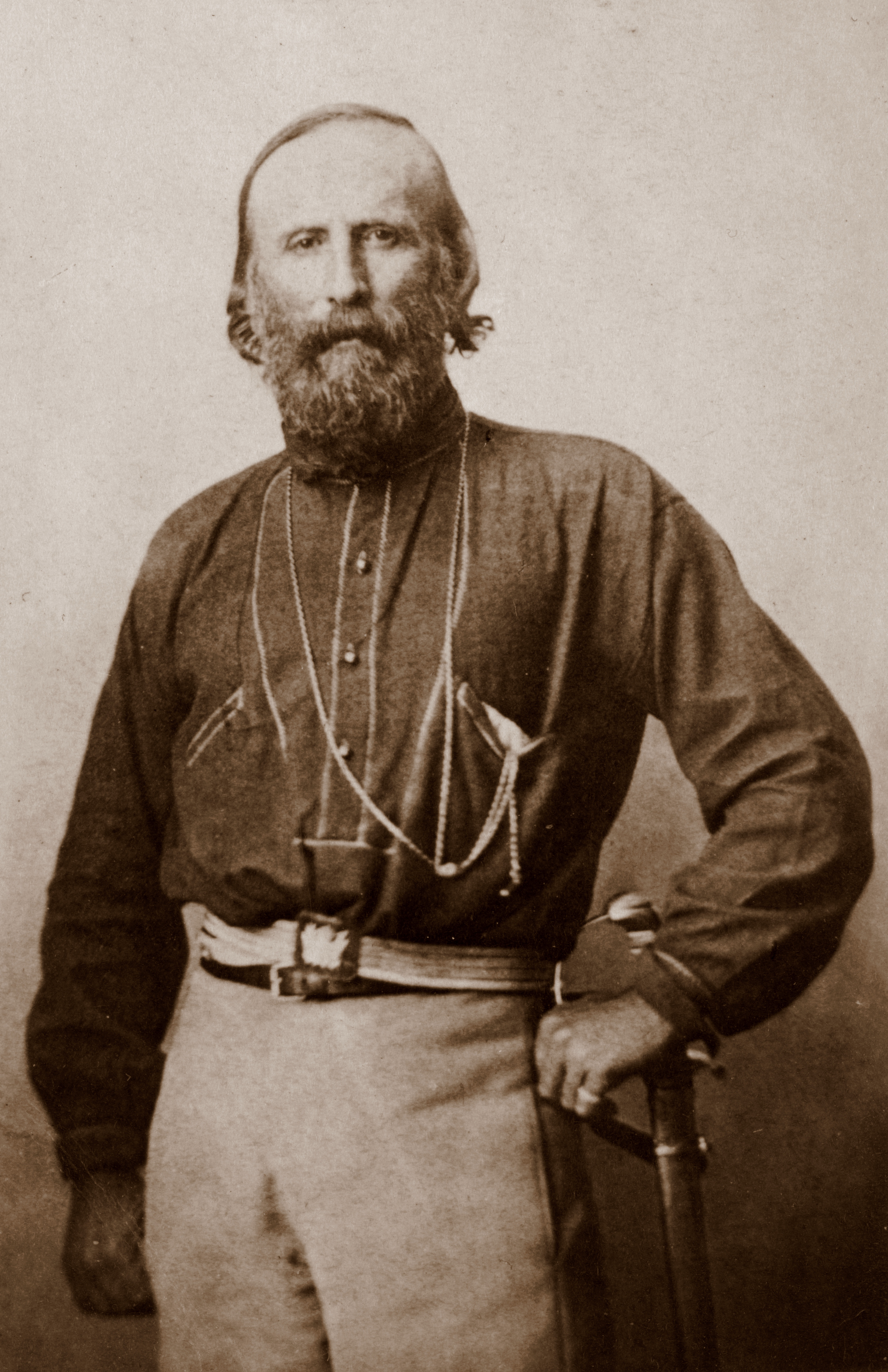
Giuseppe Garibaldi made his first contributions to the cause of Risorgimento during the First Italian War of Independence.

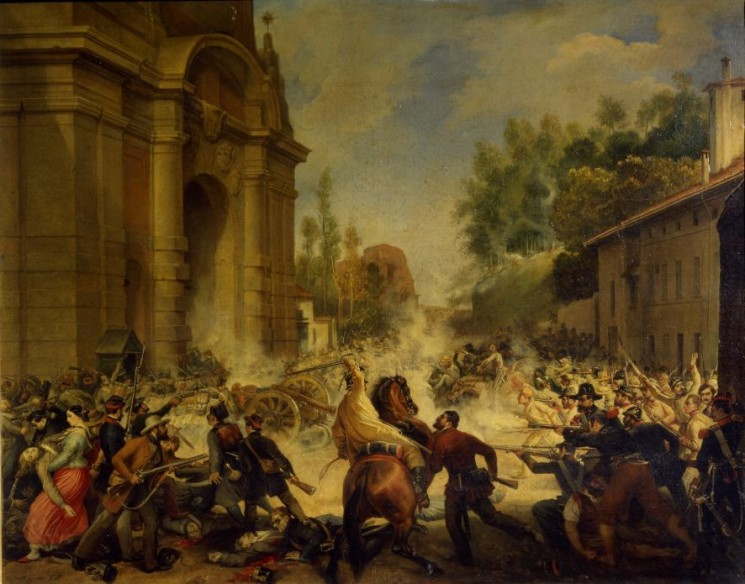
The expulsion of the Austrians from Bologna on 8 August 1848, as painted by Antonio Muzzi (1815–1894)

Having been sent away by Minister of War Antonio Franzini at the beginning of July 1848 as mentioned above, Giuseppe Garibaldi put himself at the disposal of the provisional government of Milan. He managed to form a volunteer Corps of 5000 men and on 30 July 1848, he entered Bergamo with them. From there he advanced to Monza, where he received news of the negotiations for the surrender of Milan on 5 August.

He was not at all discouraged by the rumours of an armistice and decided to continue waging a 'war of the people.' From Monza he moved on to Como and when he was not able to increase the size of his forces there, he went on to San Fermo. Sick of marching, the volunteers began to desert, so that when he entered Piedmontese territory on 10 August (at Castelletto sopra Ticino), Garibaldi had no more than a thousand men at his disposal. Here, Duke Ferdinand of Genoa asked him to respect the terms of the armistice, but he refused and crossed the border back into Lombardy–Venetia.

Finally, on 15 August at Luino, he encountered a column of around 450–500 Austrians, who fled, leaving 2 dead and 14 wounded on the field. Another 37 were taken prisoner. This was the first real military action by Garibaldi in Italy and his first victory. However, Radetzky sent another force against him, which fought two brief engagements with Garibaldi at Arcisate and Morazzone on 25 and 26 August. Garibaldi eluded capture and fled to Switzerland.

== The 'war of the people' during the armistice (9 August 1848 – 20 March 1849) ==
First Italian War of Independence (war of the people)
- Part of Revolutions of 1848
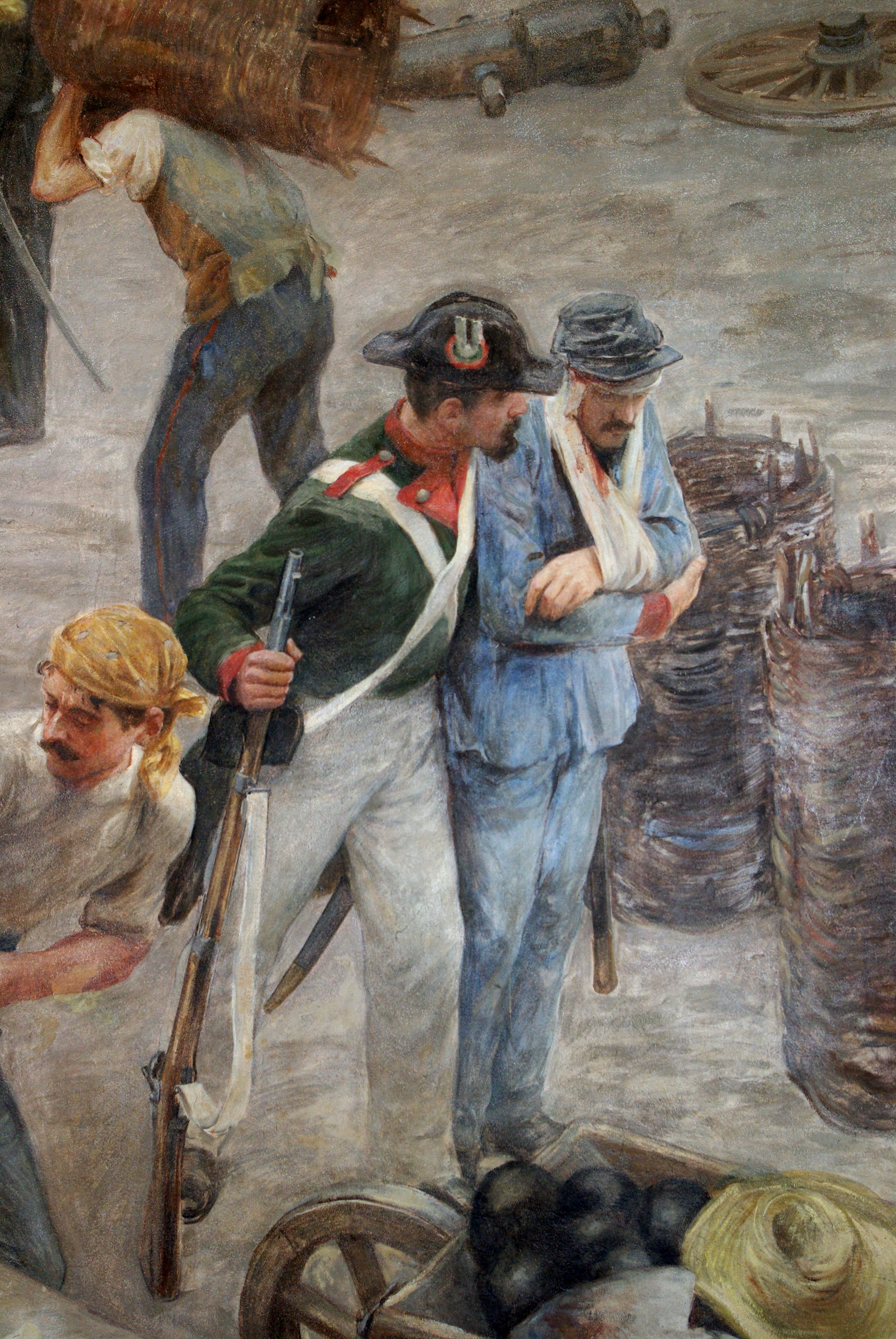
- Defenders of Venice during the siege in 1849, as painted by Vittorio Emanuele Bressanin (detail)
Date	23 March 1848 – 22 August 1849
Location	Italy
Result	Restoration of the monarchies and defeat of the revolutionaries
Territorial changes	Status quo ante bellum

Belligerents
Provisional Government of Milan; Kingdom of Sicily; Republic of San Marco (Italy) Tuscan Republic; Roman Republic Italian volunteers	Austrian Empire; Kingdom of the Two Sicilies; Papal State; Grand Duchy of Tuscany France

Commanders and leaders
Ludwik Mierosławski; Guglielmo Pepe; Giuseppe Garibaldi	Josef Radetzky; Carlo Filangieri (France) Charles Oudinot

At the beginning of 1848, all of Sicily had revolted against the Bourbons and defeated the army of Ferdinand II. A new constitution was approved and on 10 July, the Sicilian Parliament spontaneously elected Ferdinand of Savoy, Duke of Genoa, as their new king. He decided that he had to refuse the offer, given the serious military situation in Savoy at the time. The refusal of the Duke of Genoa led to serious weakening of the Sicilian government, even as a military force departed from Naples, on 30 August 1848, led by Carlo Filangieri, Prince of Satriano, who would reconquer Sicily in 1849.

After the armistice of Salasco, Prince Franz de Paula of Liechtenstein marched on Modena and Parma to restore their deposed dukes, while General Ludwig von Welden crossed the Po near Ferrara on 28 July and then, perhaps on his own initiative, diverted 7,000 men from the Siege of Venice to occupy Bologna. This city rose in revolt on 8 August and the Austrians had to abandon it the next day.

In Venice, the only city in Lombardy–Venetia which remained in the hands of the insurgents, the parliament had decided to accept annexation by the Kingdom of Sardinia on 5 July 1848. On 7 August, three Savoyard commissioners were appointed to administer the city, but when the Armistice of Salasco was reported in the city, they had to abandon Venice, along with the Royal Sardinian Navy. Daniele Manin then took control of the besieged city and established a triumvirate. Command of the troops was given to the former Neapolitan general Guglielmo Pepe, who managed to drive the Austrians out of Mestre at the end of October and take command of it for himself.

At Osoppo in Friuli, following the armistice, around 350 patriots ensconced themselves in the fortress under the command of Leonardo Andervolti, until they were forced to surrender to the Austrians on 13 October 1848.

In Lombardy in the same month, Giuseppe Mazzini decided to come down from the Canton of Ticino with a group of volunteers to take control of Lake Como. Before this could take place, however, on 28 October the spontaneous uprising of the Val d'Intelvi, led by Andrea Brenta. Although the element of surprise was lost, Mazzini decided to invade anyway and three columns containing a total of 850 men descended from Switzerland into the Val d'Intelvi, heading for Lake Como and for Luino. At Como, Mazzini's men were not welcomed by the population and a conflict with the military commanders of the expedition probably caused its failure. Between the end of October and the middle of November, the Austrians regained control of the territory.

=== Proclamation of the Tuscan and Roman Republics ===
In the Grand Duchy of Tuscany, Leopold II appointed the democrat Giuseppe Montanelli as prime minister on 27 October 1848, whose policy was to seek union with the other Italian states and to restart the war with Austria. But events overtook them. In Rome on 15 November 1848, the Roman minister of the interior, Pellegino Rossi was assassinated and on the evening of 24th, Pope Pius IX fled the city for the Neapolitan fortress of Gaeta. Montanelli demanded that Grand Duke Leopold II make common cause with the Romans, but he decided instead to leave the capital on 30 January 1849 and take refuge aboard an English ship at Porto Santo Stefano.

A few days later, on 8 February, Giuseppe Mazzini swept into Florence and on 15 February a Tuscan Republic was proclaimed. With the help of the Piedmontese ambassador Salvatore Pes, Savoy attempted to have Leopold II return to Florence rather than lose an ally in the forthcoming renewal of war with Austria. But under the influence of Catholic clergy, Leopold refused this and joined the Pope at Gaeta.

Meanwhile, on 9 February, a Roman Republic was proclaimed, which was also governed by Giuseppe Mazzini and which Giuseppe Garibaldi fought for strenuously.

== The second campaign (20 – 24 March 1849) ==
=== Forces in the field ===
Against the advice of the Minister of War Giuseppe Dabormida, who wanted to place a Frenchman in command of the Piedmontese army, Charles Albert decided to appoint a less experienced Polish general, Wojciech Chrzanowski. At the same time, various commanders from the first campaign were dismissed: Ettore de Sonnaz, Eusebio Bava (who had published an account of the king's interventions in the decision making process of the high command), and Carlo Salasco. A number of different men served as Minister of War during the months of the armistice, one after another: Dabormida, Alfonso La Marmora, Ettore de Sonnaz, Agostino Chiodo, who made various attempts to improve the quality of the army: some groups were sent to rest, soldiers with families were moved into the reserves, other groups were recalled, the Corps of the Bersaglieri was augmented and new recruits were excluded from the front lines. On 1 March 1849, the Chamber of Deputies voted for the resumption of the war, with 94 votes in favour and 24 against. Charles Albert decided that hostilities would resume on 20 March.

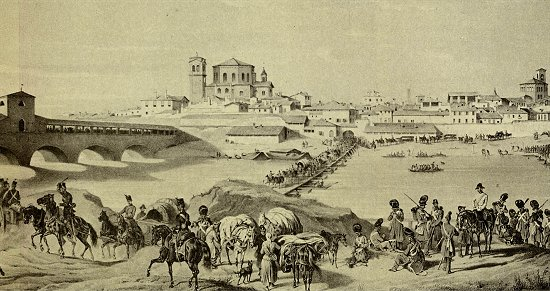
The Austrians crossing the Ticino at Pavia on 20 March 1849, to create a bridgehead for an invasion of the Kingdom of Sardinia.

The Piedmontese army, which had abandoned the groupings by Corps in advance of the resumption of hostilities, consisted of the five original divisions (1st, 2nd, 3rd, 4th, and reserves), as well as three new divisions: the 5th Division (the Lombards), the 6th Division (led by Alfonso La Marmora) and the provisional reserve division. On paper, Charles Albert's army contained 150,000 men, but when the men who were sick or on leave are discounted, that number was reduced to 115,000, of which only 62,000 were front line troops. At the last moment, moreover, General Ettore Perrone di San Martino took over from Maria Broglia as commander of the 3rd Division.

The geographic arrangement of the forces was as follows: the five original divisions were around Novara, with a brigade near Lago Maggiore to the north and the 5th Division between Alessandria and Voghera to the south. Further afield, there was a brigade opposite Piacenza (in the Duchy of Parma, occupied by the Austrians) and the 6th Division was at Sarzana and then at Parma.

On the other hand, the Austrian army, which was given eight days warning before the resumption of hostilities, in accordance with the terms of the Armistice of Salasco, was all concentrated in Pavia and its surroundings by 20 March 1849. Radetzky's forces amounted to 73,000 men, not including the 25,000 men commanded by Julius Jacob von Haynau who were tied up at Venice and the troops in garrisons (at Piacenza, these consisted of a whole brigade). With respect to the commanders, Radetzky had preferred wherever possible to keep the same people in the same positions as in 1848. Eugen Wratislaw von Mitrowitz was in charge of the 1st Corps, Konstantin d'Aspre of the 2nd, Christian von Appel of the 3rd, Georg Thurn Valsassina of the 4th, and Gustav Wocher of the 1st reserve Corps.

=== Invasion of the Kingdom of Sardinia (20 March) ===
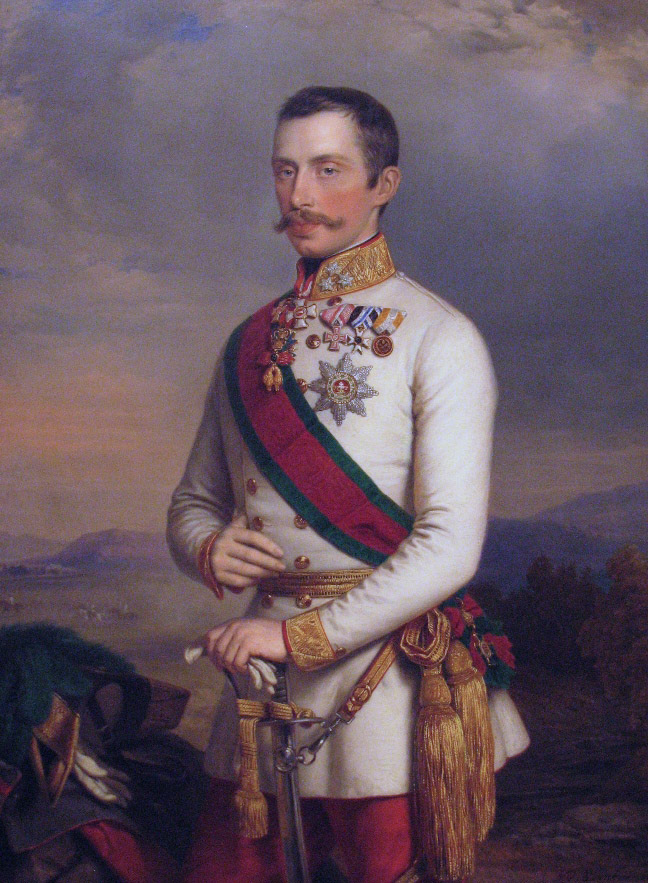
Archduke Albrecht commanded the division whose victory at La Cava on the Ticino River opened the road to Lomellina for the whole Austrian army. Painting by Miklós Barabás.

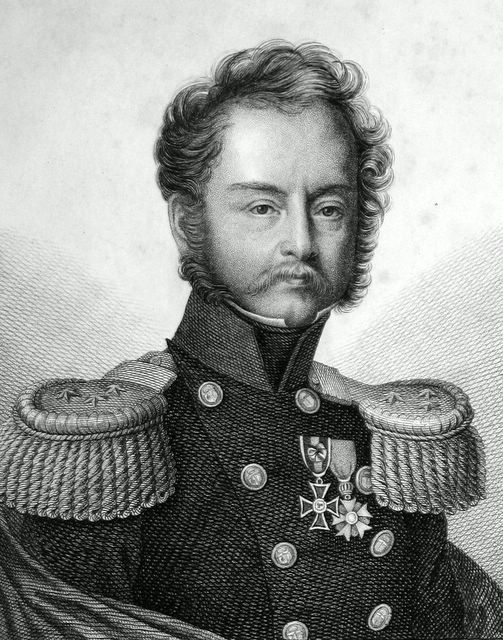
Girolamo Ramorino was court martialed at Turin and shot for his negligence in command of the Lombard division.

At noon on 20 March 1849, hostilities officially resumed. Aside from a reconnaissance expedition over the Ticino near Magenta, the Piedmontese did not move. Radetzky, on the other hand, used Pavia as the bridgehead for a surprise invasion of the Kingdom of Sardinia.

On the Sardinian side the area of the Austrian attack was the responsibility of the Lombard Division, whose commander Girolamo Ramorino had received an order on 16 March to move forward and hold the strong point at La Cava, from which it would be possible to watch over the final section of the Ticino River down to its confluence with the Po. In the event of difficulty, the division was to retreat to the north through Sannazzaro to Mortara. However, Ramorino was convinced that the Austrians intended to seize Alessandria and the attack across the Ticino River on 20 March was just a feint. As a result, he left only the 21st Infantry Regiment at La Cava and ordered the regiment to retreat to the south, over the Po River, in the event of serious difficulties.

But Ramorino was wrong. At noon on 20 March, Archduke Albrecht led his division over the Gravellone (a tributary of the Ticino outside Pavia), opening the crossing for the whole Austrian army. At La Cava Radetzky's troops had an overwhelming numerical advantage over the Piedmontese, who nevertheless resisted for 6 hours under the tenacious Major Luciano Manara. In contravention of his orders, Ramorino retreated with all his troops to the right bank of the Po and not to the north. As a result, his division was isolated. Because of this decision, which substantially weakened the position of the Piedmontese army, Ramorino was convicted by a court martial at Turin after the defeat and was executed on 22 May 1849.

=== Battle of Sforzesca (21 March 1849) ===
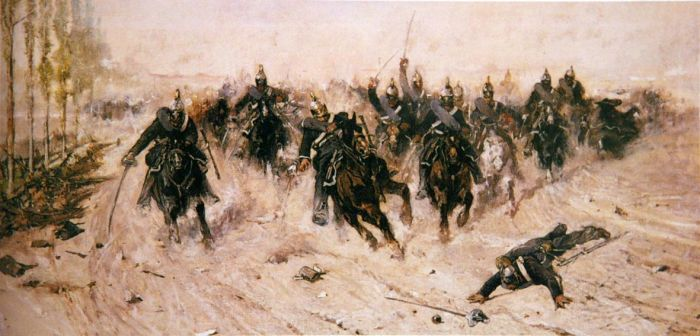
Charge of the Regiment "Piemonte Reale" at the Battle of Sforzesca, as painted by Giovanni Fattori

The Piedmontese hesitation continued for some time, until around 3am on 21 March, Chrzanowski decided to counter the enemy attack on Mortara with two divisions near the town (1st Division and reserve division) and three more at Vigevano, to threaten the right flank of the Austrian invasion force (2nd, 3rd, and 4th Divisions).

Around 11 am, the vanguard of the 1st Austrian Corps, which was advancing along the right bank of the Ticino in order to protect the bulk of the Austrian army which was heading for Mortara, encountered a unit of the Piedmontese 2nd Division on reconnaissance near Borgo San Siro (10 km south of Vigevano). Despite their superior numbers, the Austrians only managed to move past them after hours of combat in the town. At 1 pm, Charles Albert and Chrzanowski arrived at a spot a little south of Vigevano, at the villa of Sforzesca and arranged for it to be defended by the 2nd Division under Michele Giuseppe Bes on the road from Borgo San Siro and by the 3rd Division under Ettore Perrone di San Martino on the road from Gambolò. As the Austrian 1st Corps approached Sforzesca it faced two attacks from Bes' troops. Despite the arrival of enemy reinforcements and clogged streets which impeded the movement of the Piedmontese forces, Bes attacked a third time around 6 km from Sforzesca, but his attack was rebuffed. At nightfall he ordered his troops to fall back to the villa. On the road from Gambolò to Vigevano, the Austrians also attacked and were forcefully rebuffed and counterattacked.

The result of the Battle of Sforzesca was unclear. The Piedmontese had suffered 21 dead, 94 wounded and around a hundred desertions; the Austrians suffered 25 dead, 180 wounded and 120 desertions. From a tactical point of view, the Piedmontese had prevented the Austrians from marching on Vigevano, but strategically, Radetzky had succeeded in advancing the three Corps that were not involved in the battle (2nd, 3rd, and 1st reserve) along the road to Mortara, which was the principal objective of the attack.

=== Austrian advance on Novara (22 March 1849) ===
Meanwhile, at Mortara, around 4 pm on 21 March, the 1st Piedmontese division under Giovanni Durando and the reserve division under Prince Victor Emmanuel were released from battle array. Around 4:30 pm, the vanguard of the Austrian 2nd Corps made contact with the enemy. At 6 pm, although it was late in the day, General d'Aspré ordered an attack on the Piedmontese which immediately met with success in the centre. On either side of the centre of the Piedmontese front line, some battalions struggled to plug the gap. In the wings, however, the Piedmontese resisted the Austrians and d'Aspré's orders stated that the Austrian forces should not proceed further if they did that.

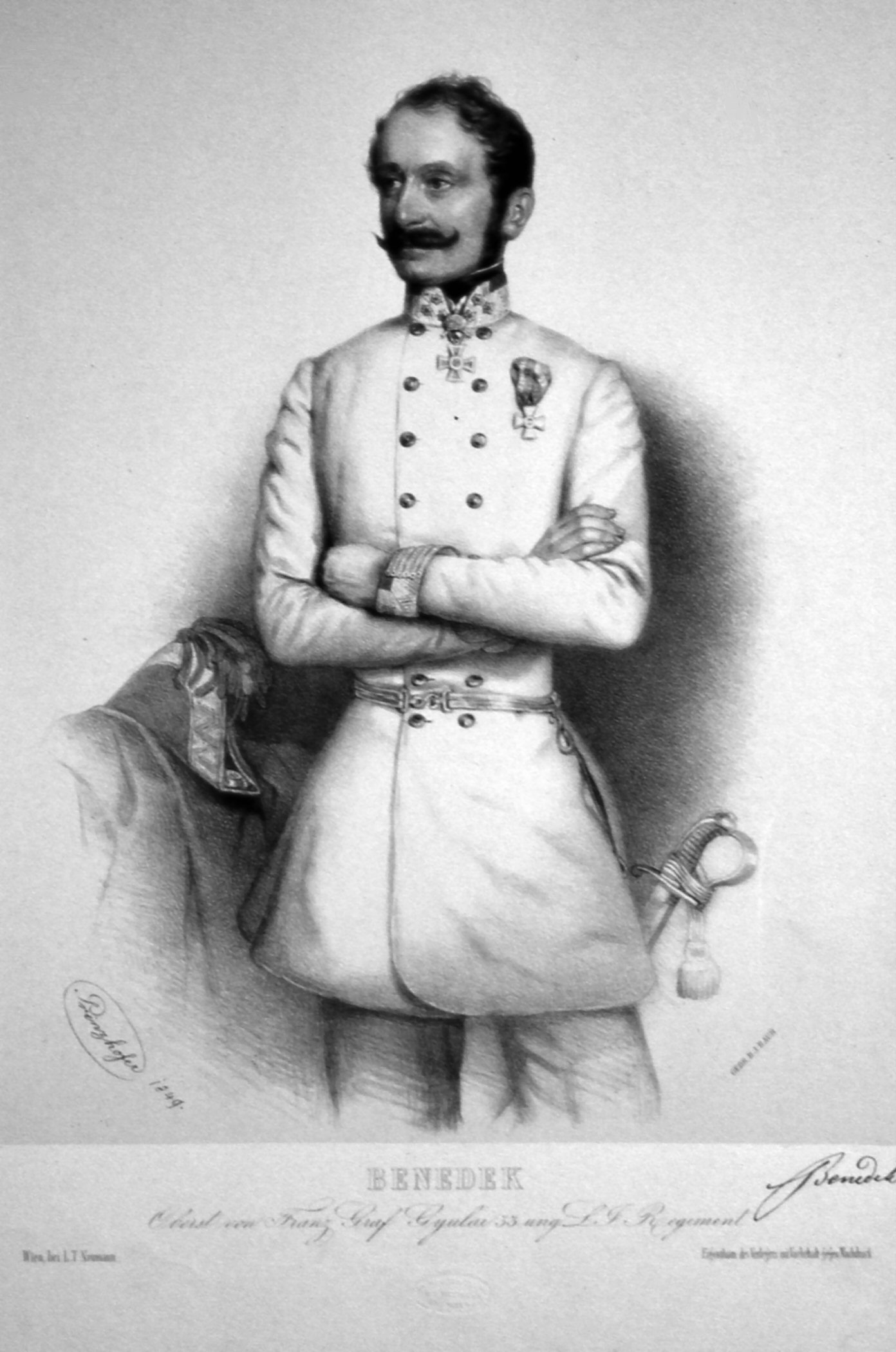
The intuition of Colonel Ludwig von Benedek was decisive for the Austrian victory at the Battle of Mortara.

But in the front lines, the Austrian colonel Ludwig von Benedek had a sense of the disordered curve of the enemy forces, despite the darkness, and advanced resolutely, forcing the Brigade "Regina" (1st Division) to retreat south to Mortara to reorganise itself. Von Benedek managed to occupy the settlement and to hold it against an attack of the Brigade "Aosta" (1st Division). In the darkness, a new Austrian attack forced the defenders to abandon the bridge over the Erbognone southeast of Mortara, as well. All this was achieved even though the troops of d'Aspré had stopped as ordered.

Alessandro La Marmora, Chrzanowski's chief of staff, who had coordinated the action of the two divisions opposing the Austrian 2nd Corps, only now realised that Mortara had been occupied and that the troops that he was commanding had been cut off. He led a column made up of the Brigade "Regina" and other troops and attempted to reach the reserve division by moving through the villages to the south of the settlement. Here his soldiers were stopped by von Benedek and most of them (2,000 men) were captured. La Marmora and a few other men who were at the head of the column managed to escape the enemy and rejoined the forces of the reserve division, which was already retreating towards Robbio and Vercelli.

This marked the end of the Battle of Mortara. The Austrians had committed 13,000 men, the Piedmontese around 7,000. The former had suffered 118 dead or wounded and the latter 121, but whereas 71 Austrians had fled, the Piedmontese had lost around 2,000 fled or captured. The most serious aspect of Charles Albert's defeat, however, was the rapid flight of the entire army, all the way to Novara.

=== Battle of Novara (23 March 1849) ===
==== Forces in the field ====
The Austrian army which continued its advance towards Vercelli and Novara on 23 March 1849 now had a notable numerical advantage: 5 Austrian Corps faced 5 Piedmontese divisions. The latter, which had all regrouped to protect Novara were arranged with the 3rd Division under Perrone to the left (southeast of Novara), the 2nd Division under Bes in the centre, and the 1st Division under Durando at right (south of Novara), with the 4th Division under the Duke of Genoa behind the 3rd Division and the reserve division under the Duke of Savoy behind the 1st Division. The whole Piedmontese force contained 45,000 infantry, 2,500 cavalry and 109 cannons. Two and a half divisions remained, uselessly, on the other side of the Po.

The Austrian forces consisted of the 2nd Corps under d'Aspre, the 3rd Corps under Appel, and the reserve Corps under Wocher. The 4th Corps under Thurn, which was advancing on Vercelli with the 1st Corps under Wratislaw, was partially involved too. Radetzky's five Corps contained a total of 70,000 infantry, 5,000 cavalry and 205 cannons.

==== The decisive defeat of Charles Albert ====
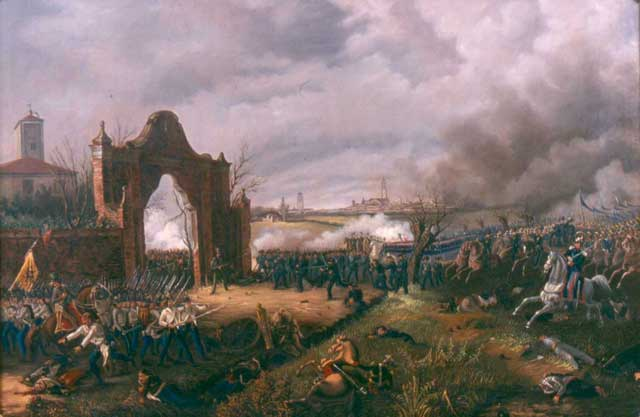
The Battle of Novara. The fighting near the Villa Visconti, between the Bicocca and the farmhouse of the Cavallotta, as depicted by Giuseppe Prina.

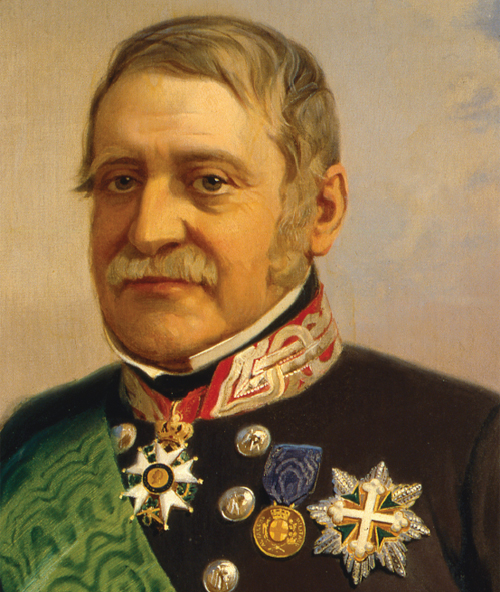
Ettore Perrone di San Martino, commander of the Piedmontese 3rd Division, was mortally wounded in the Battle of Novara.

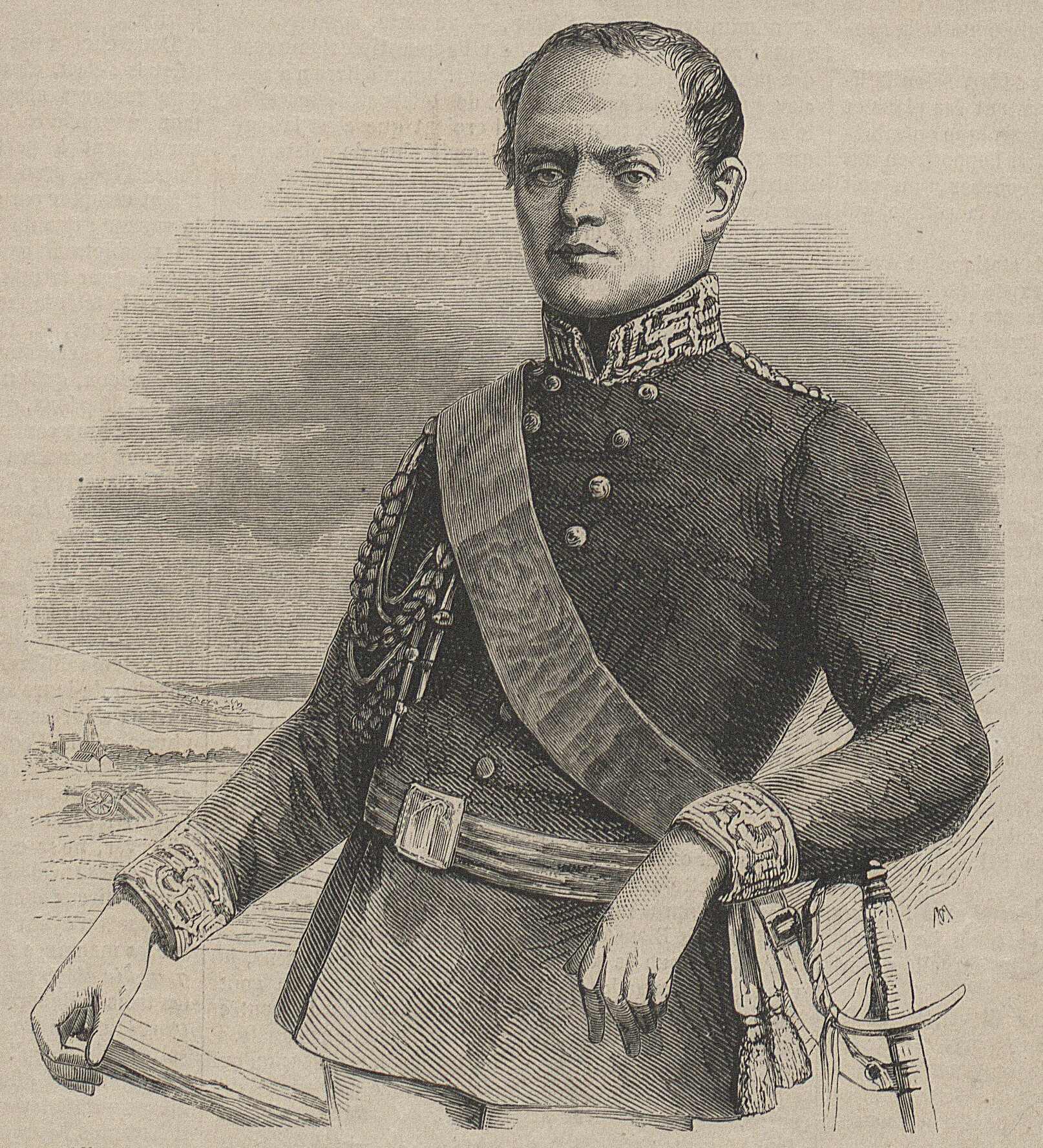
The Polish general Wojciech Chrzanowski commanded the Piedmontese army in the second campaign of the war, along with Charles Albert.

The advance of the Austrian troops of the 2nd Corps was spotted at around 11 am from the bell tower of the village of Bicocca, around 2 km southeast of the centre of Novara. The morning was cold and wet. Konstantin d'Aspré immediately attacked with his men, but withdrew with heavy casualties. In the early afternoon, an attack by Archduke Albrecht's division was followed by a counterattack of the Piedmontese 3rd Division which was turned back in turn. At Bicocca, the Piedmontese attacked again and the Austrians were forced to pull back to the farmhouse of the Cavallotta (3 km southeast of the centre of Novara). At 2 pm there was a break in the fighting.

Reinforcements reached d'Aspré from the rear of his 2nd Corps and he attacked twice with these, bringing his troops almost all the way to Bicocca. Ettore Perrone di San Martino then attempted another counterattack, managing to stop the enemy advance, but suffering a fatal wound to the head in the process. At this point, the Duke of Genoa intervened with the 4th Division and the Austrians withdrew almost all the way to Cavallotta. At 3 pm, the Austrian 2nd Corps withdrew to Olengo (4 km southeast of the centre of Novara).

Just as the Duke of Genoa was forcing the Austrian 2nd Corps to retreat, Chrzanowski ordered him to turn around, also instructing the 2nd Division under Bes to maintain a defensive attitude. This allowed the Austrian troops to reorganise. After an hour of quiet, the battle resumed at 4 pm. This time, the Austrian 3rd Corps attacked and, after an initial success, it was forced to pull back. Chrzanowski then attempted a counterattack with the 2nd Division supported by the 1st Division, but had to abandon it because of the threat from the Austrian 4th Corps, which had been recalled from its advance on Vercelli and was now moving in from the west.

Meanwhile, at Bicocca, the final, decisive Austrian attack was launched, while to the west the 4th Corps began to attack the Piedmontese forces in that area (portions of the 1st Division and of the reserves). Around 6 pm, the whole Piedmontese line was in crisis and allowed the enemy to occupy Bicocca. The Austrian vanguard pursued them to the Abbey of San Nazzaro della Costa, 1 km from the walls of Novara. Here they met intense Piedmontese resistance led by the Duke of Genoa, which enabled the troops under Charles Albert to withdraw into the city in a relatively orderly manner.

The Battle of Novara was the last and bloodiest battle of the First Italian War of Independence. On the Piedmontese side there were 578 dead, 1,405 wounded and 409 fled or captured. On the Austrian side, 410 were dead, 1,850 wounded, and 963 were captured or fled.

=== Vignale Armistice (23 – 24 March 1849) ===
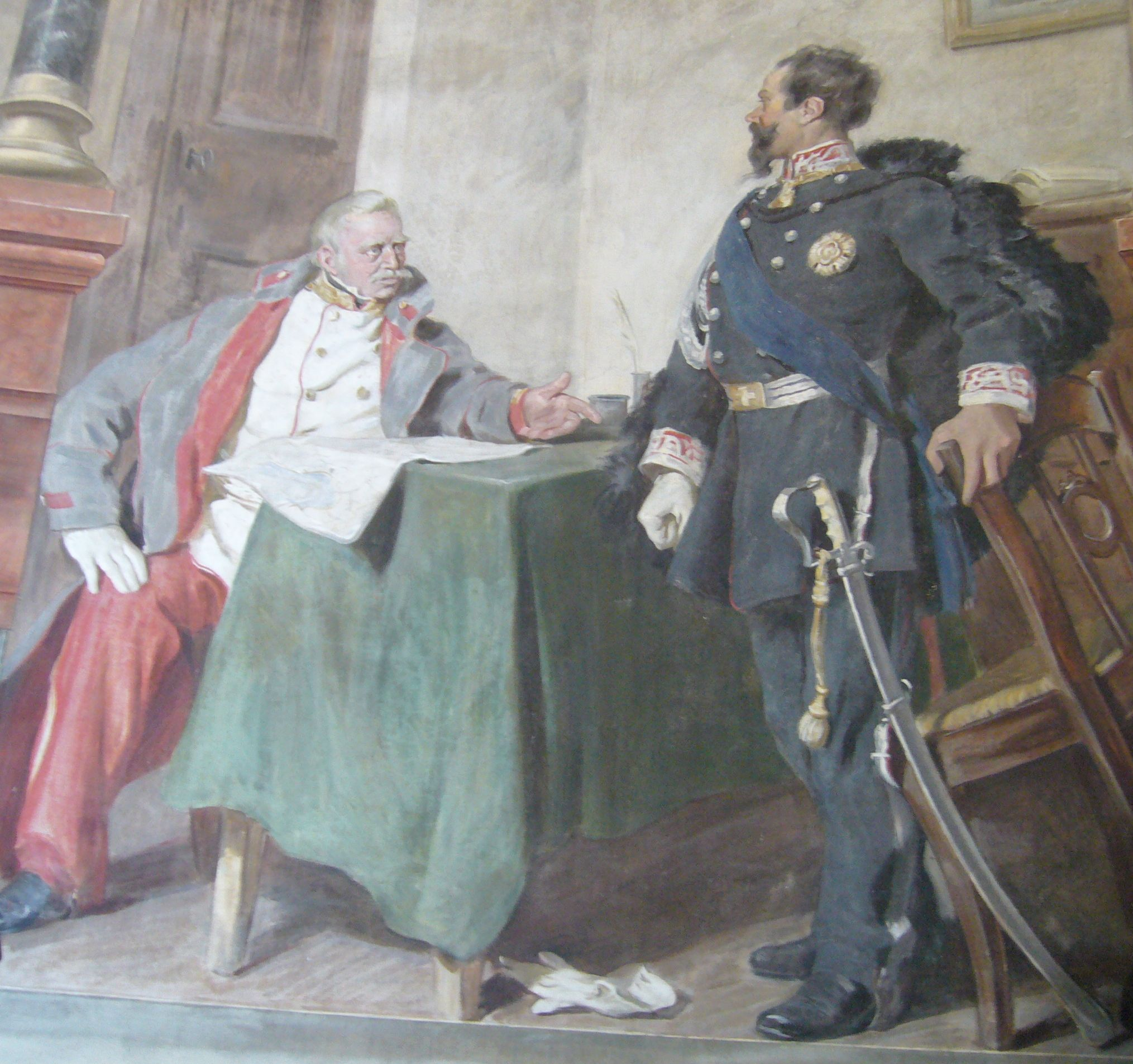
At Vignale on 24 March 1849, the new king of Sardinia, Victor Emmanuel II loses his temper in front of Radetzky, upon reading the Austrian peace terms, as depicted in a fresco by Vittorio Emanuele Bressanin in the Tower of San Martino della Battaglia.

Charles Albert asked the Austrians on what terms he could seek an armistice and they stated that they would demand the occupation of the Lomellina and Alessandria. At 9:15 pm on 23 March 1849, the King called a council of war, with Chrzanowski, Alessandro La Marmora, the Duke of Savoy, and the Duke of Genoa, as well as the King's two aides de campe, generals Carlo Emanuele La Marmora and Giacomo Durando. Everyone at the meeting spoke in negative terms about the possibility of resuming hostilities. At this point, Charles Albert declared that he intended to abdicate.

That evening, at Novara, the soldiers, who were exhausted, disheartened, and starving as a result of chronic provisioning failures, caused numerous serious disturbances. During the night and the following morning, the soldiers were joined by locals and the situation degenerated into violence and looting.

Between 2 pm and 3 pm on 24 March 1849, at Vignale, 4 km north of Novara, the Duke of Savoy, who had become King Victor Emmanuel II met with Radetzky and agreed to the armistice. The Austrians forced him to agree that a force of 20,000 men would remain in Lomellina and that Alessandria would be occupied by them until the conclusion of a final peace, although they allowed a Piedmontese garrison to remain as well. The Armistice of Vignale was followed by the Peace of Milan on 6 August 1849, in which Piedmont-Sardinia was forced to pay an indemnity of 65 million francs to Austria.

In the following days, Radetzky decisively defeated the Lombard patriots by snuffing out the Ten Days of Brescia (23 March – 1 April 1849)

== Aftermath of the Piedmontese defeat ==
The repercussions of the defeat at Novara reverberated throughout the whole of Italy. In Tuscany, the restoration took place spontaneously, when the moderate party recalled Grand Duke Leopold II. This did not prevent the Austrian 2nd Corps under D'Aspré from entering Tuscan territory and imposing the restoration by force at Livorno. This city had not accepted the decision made by the moderate party in the capital, Florence, but was forced to give in after two days of bitter fighting (10–11 May 1849). Leopold II cautiously returned to Florence on 28 June.

=== Kingdom of Sardinia ===
In the Kingdom of Sardinia, Genoa, which had been an independent republic until its annexation by the House of Savoy 35 years earlier, revolted on 1 April 1849. Rumours spread through the city that the Albertine Statute was to be abolished and that Genoa and Alessandria were to be ceded to Austria as part of the peace agreement.

In a few hours, the rebels had overcome the Piedmontese garrison, but Alfonso La Marmora advanced with the 6th Division from Parma which had been recalled to suppress the riot. The rebels quickly surrendered. Nevertheless, to quash any thought of independence, La Marmora ordered the bombardment of the city and then an assault, followed by a sack. At dawn on 6 April, Genoa surrendered and an American ship took 450 Genoese into exile, including those most implicated in the revolt.

=== Austrian invasion of the Papal States ===
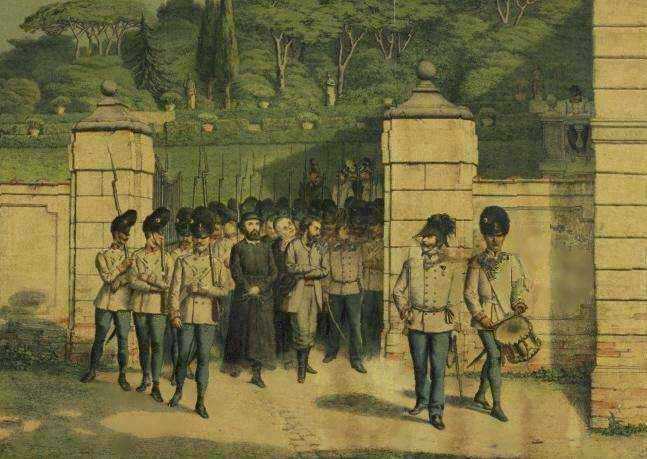
Bologna: Ugo Bassi and Giovanni Livraghi are led to the gallows.

Meanwhile, many cities of the Papal States in Marche, Romagna, and Emilia had joined the Roman Republic. These included Ancona, which had joined on 16 February, eleven days after the Republic's proclamation and Bologna which had already expelled the Austrians who had occupied the city on 8 August 1848.

The Roman Republic had declared that the temporal power of the Church was abolished. Only then did Pius IX, from his place of exile in Gaeta, openly request armed intervention by the Austrians in the Papal State. The Austrian invasion began on 18 February 1849 with the occupation of Ferrara. Bologna and Ancona did not admit the occupying forces and were placed under siege; Bologna resisted for a week; Ancona for twenty five days.

==== Siege of Bologna (8–16 May 1849) ====
The Austrian general Franz Graf von Wimpffen advanced against Bologna first with two precious advantages compared to the earlier attack by Welden in July–August 1848: the Austrians no longer came as invaders, but "in the name of the Pope King" and he had 7,000 soldiers and 13 cannons with steady reinforcements available from the moment that Piedmont had been defeated.

On 8 May 1849, the assault of the city began. It was defended by around 2,000 men, led by the Anconan colonel Angelo Pichi. On account of the strong resistance that they encountered, the Austrians stopped the attack and called in reinforcements. When these arrived on 14 May, the besieging force totaled 20,000 men with plenty of artillery, that began an intense bombardment which continued for 48 hours. On the morning of 16 May, an envoy sent by General von Wimpffen was rebuffed by the people and the bombardment continued until the Bolognese surrendered at 2pm and the city was occupied. On 8 August, the Austrians executed Ugo Bassi and Giovanni Livraghi, two prominent leaders of the Roman Republic at Bologna.

==== Siege of Ancona (25 May – 21 June 1849) ====
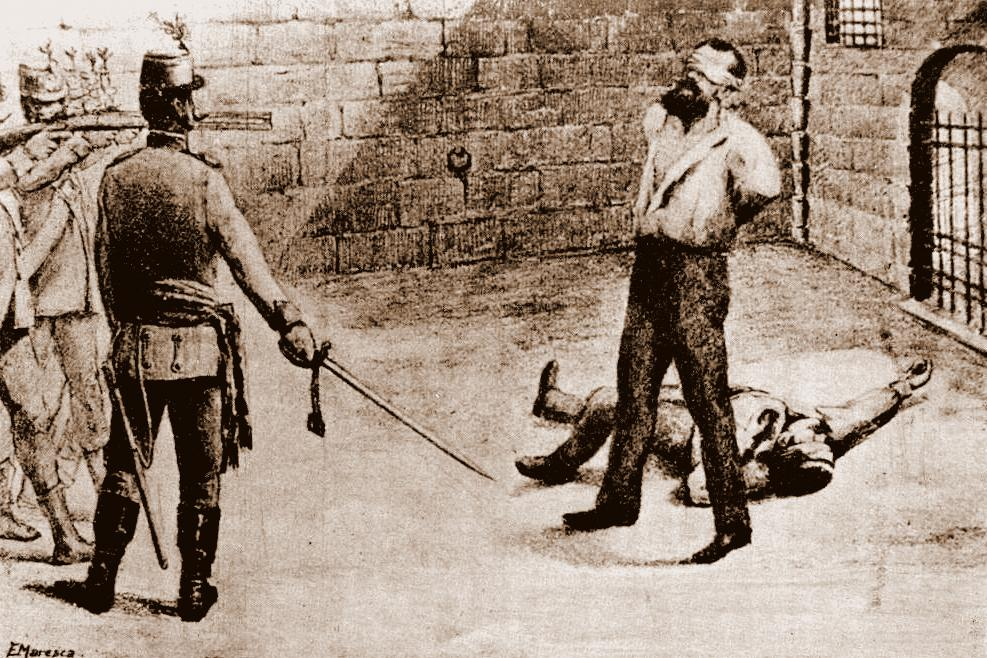
The execution of Antonio Elia at Ancona

The Austrians then marched on Ancona, which had joined the Roman Republic and had promised Garibaldi that it would provide concrete aid in the defence of the Republic. The Austrians encountered fierce resistance. The siege began on 25 May 1849. A total of around 5,000 Italians from the whole of Marche and from Lombardy joined in the defense of the city, against a besieging force of over 16,000 men. The government of the Roman Republic had placed the Bolognese colonel Livio Zambeccari in charge of the fortress of Ancona. The poet Luigi Mercantini was also among the defenders. The commander of the Austrian forces was Franz Graf von Wimpffen.

The siege was undertaken on land and sea simultaneously. After the arrival of reinforcements (the siege equipment and another 5,000 men) on 6 June, the Austrians began intense bombardment on 15 June. Two close associates of Garibaldi, Antonio Elia and his son Augusto Elia distinguished themselves in the fighting. The young men had established the "Drappello della Morte" (Death Squad) which carried out a number of daring acts. During one sortie from the wall to attack an Austrian encampment on 21 June, the captain Giovanni Gervasoni of Crema was killed. On the same day, after twenty-six days of fighting, Ancona was occupied by the Austrians, who conceded the honours of war to the defenders. During the subsequent military occupation of the city, Antonio Elia was executed as an example to the populace.

=== Fall of the Kingdom of Sicily (March – 15 May 1849) ===
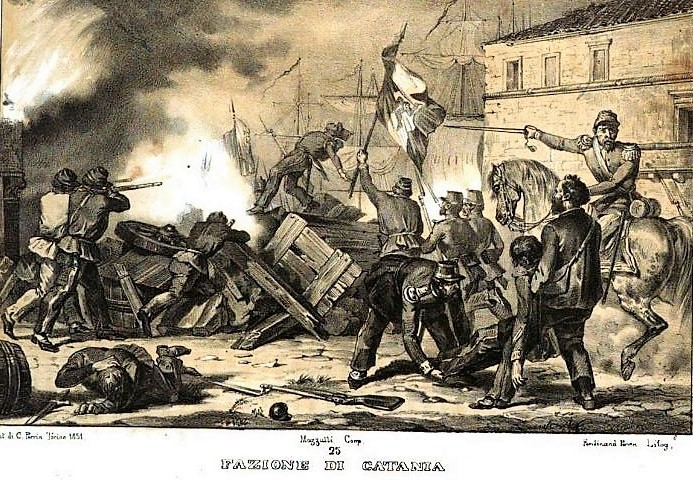
Clashes between Bourbon troops and Sicilian militiamen at Catania

In Sicily, hostilities had resumed in March 1849. General Filangieri, Prince of Satriano denounced the armistice of October and the Bourbon advance against the Sicilian militias set out from the Real Cittadella in Messina. The Sicilians under Mierosławski numbered around 6,000 and could do little against the 13,500 men under Filangieri. On 7 April, after fierce fighting, these troops occupied Catania. On 14 April the Sicilian parliament in Palermo voted to accept the proposal of King Ferdinand II in the decree of 28 February which they had previously refused. This was a statute inspired by the Sicilian constitution of 1812, including a Sicilian parliament with a chamber of peers and a chamber of commons, as well as the appointment of a viceroy. Nevertheless, the war continued. On 5 May, the Neapolitan troops reached Bagheria, the port of the capital, where there was some fighting between 8 May and 10 May. News then arrived that the King had granted an amnesty and on 15 May 1849, the Bourbon troops entered Palermo, while the 43 Sicilian leaders, who were excluded from the armistice, fled into exile in Malta. General Filangieri became governor of Sicily, with the title of Lieutenant general of the King, which he retained until 1855.

=== End of the Roman Republic (24 April – 2 July 1849) ===
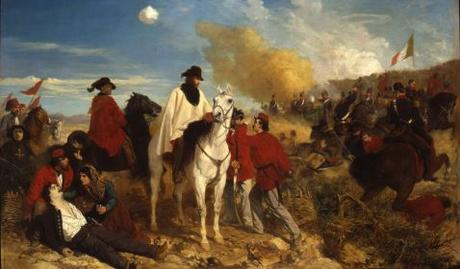
Giuseppe Garibaldi (in white) defends Rome from French troops. Painting by George Housman Thomas.

For the forces of restoration, the problem of the Roman Republic was not yet resolved, since Rome under the triumvirate of Aurelio Saffi, Carlo Armellini and Giuseppe Mazzini still resisted. For Austria, which was still tied up with the Hungarian revolution, occupying Rome as well was too onerous. In France however, Louis Napoleon feared the expansion of Austrian influence in Italy and wanted to win the loyalty of France's Catholics, so he organised an expedition to restore Pius IX to the papal throne.

On 24 April 1849, a French army led by general Charles Oudinot disembarked at Civitavecchia. Oudinot attempted to take Rome on 30 April, but was soundly defeated by Garibaldi. In the meantime, an expeditionary force from Naples had invaded southern Lazio, advancing to Frascati and Tivoli, but it too was stopped by Garibaldi, in the Battle of Palestrina on 9 May and rebuffed for good in the Battle of Velletri on 19 May.

Only after the arrival of 30,000 reinforcements did Oudinot reopen hostilities on 3 June, launching a surprise attack on the Romans at Villa Pamphili (he had sworn to maintain a truce until 4 June). After they took Villa Pamphili, the French deployed their artillery and began to bombard Rome. Fighting continued until 1 July and the day after that, the Roman Republic surrendered. Pius IX returned to Rome on 12 April 1850 and cancelled the constitution that he had conceded in March 1849.

Garibaldi left Rome with a small group of volunteers a little before the capture of the city in a vain attempt to reach Venice. Although pursued by the Austrians, he managed to reach Piedmontese territory, where he was expelled on 16 September 1849. He thus began his second exile, which would see him visit America and then Asia and Australia.

== Siege and fall of Venice (28 April – 22 August 1849) ==
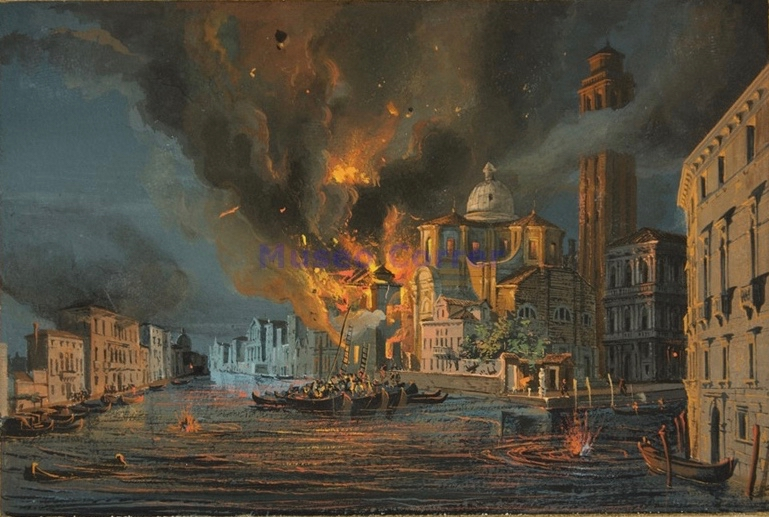
San Geremia in Venice, struck by Austrian artillery in 1849. Painting by Luigi Querena.

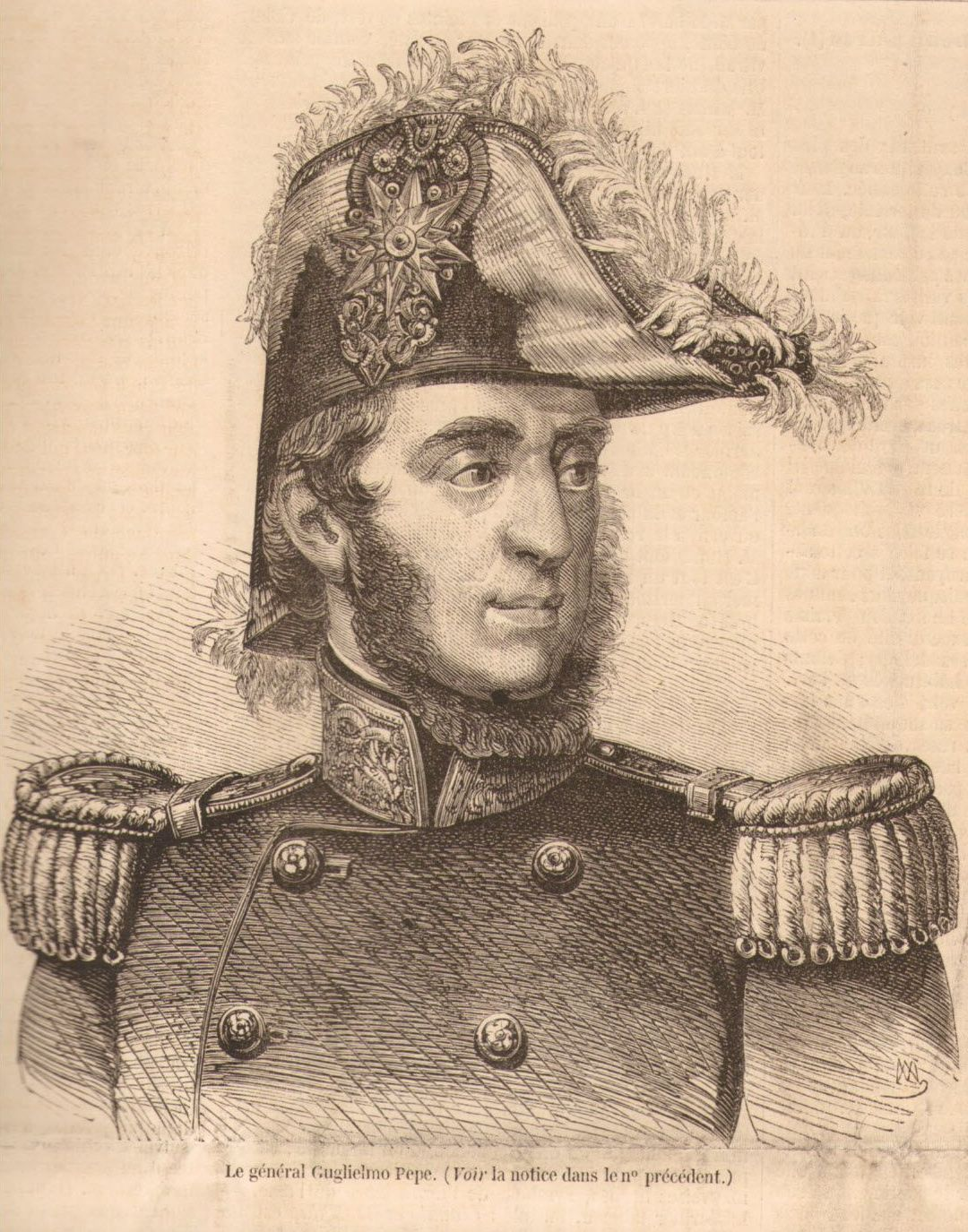
General Guglielmo Pepe

After he had suppressed the Ten Days of Brescia, General Julius Jacob von Haynau advanced on Venice with an army of 30,000 men in April 1849. In Venice, Guglielmo Pepe had gathered the modest forces of the Republic of San Marco and, with the agreement of Daniele Manin, he had arranged them to resist to the bitter end.

General Haynau focused on Marghera, where a strong Venetian garrison of around 2,000 men commanded by the Neapolitan colonel Girolamo Calà Ulloa was stationed. On 28 April, he placed the fort of Marghera under siege and on 4 May the bombardment began. Marghera resisted for twenty-two days. On 26 May, the defenders escaped back to Venice.

Once Marghera had fallen, the other Venetian strongholds on the mainland no longer had any purpose and they were all evacuated. In June, von Haynau departed for Hungary to suppress the revolution there and was replaced by Georg von Thurn und Valsassina. There were numerous attacks and counter-attacks around Marghera and Venice, in which Colonel Cesare Rosaroll, one of the Neapolitan officers who had disobeyed Ferdinand II's order to retreat was among the dead.

12 July the Austrians launched hot air balloons with bombs attached to them from a frigate in the Venetian lagoon, but the wind blew in such a way that none of them hit the city. Artillery bombardment of Venice began on 28 July. The defenders were short of food and on 1 August, the Lombard Major Giuseppe Sirtori carried out a raid on the mainland to get flour and livestock. But another raid carried out a few days later had to be abandoned without any success. Meanwhile, the news of events elsewhere in Italy had sapped the morale of the defenders, who were also suffering from an outbreak of cholera. By 22 August, the city had been reduced to extremes: 2,788 Venetians had died of cholera. Manin was therefore forced to agree to surrender. Two days later, the Austrians entered Venice. With the end of the Siege of Venice, the last holdout of the Italian cause was defeated.

== See also ==
- Revolutions of 1848 in the Italian states
- Italian unification
- Naval operations of the First Italian War of Independence
- Royal war and popular war
- Republic of San Marco
- Roman Republic (19th century)
- Second Italian War of Independence
- Third Italian War of Independence

== Bibliography ==
- Fabris, Cecilio (1898). Gli avvenimenti militari del 1848 e 1849. Vol. I, Part II. Turin: Roux Frassati.
- Fabris, Cecilio (1898). Gli avvenimenti militari del 1848 e 1849. Vol. I, Part III. Turin: Roux Frassati.
- Giglio, Vittorio (1948). Il Risorgimento nelle sue fasi di guerra. Vol. I. Milan: Vallardi.
- Pieri, Piero (1962). Storia militare del Risorgimento. Turin: Einaudi.
- Scardigli, Marco (2011). Le grandi battaglie del Risorgimento. Milan: Rizzoli. ISBN 978-88-17-04611-4.
