= Miss Grand Italy 2025 =

7th Miss Grand Italy pageant

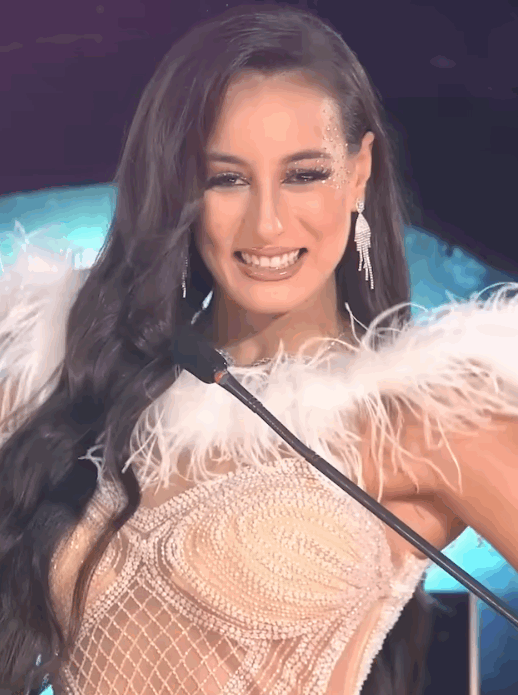
- Elisa Crocchianti
- Date: 14 September 2025
- Presenters: Stefania Orlando; Nicola Santini
- Venue: Cinecittà World, Rome
- Broadcaster: Amazon Prime Video; Sky; Canale Italia
- Entrants: 37
- Placements: 20
- Winner: Elisa Crocchianti (Lazio)

External videos
- Miss Grand Italy 2025 Finals
- 2025 Miss Grand Italy Finals by MUPI SRL

Miss Grand Italy 2025 (Italian: Miss Grand International Italia 2025) was the 7th Miss Grand Italy pageant, held on 14 September 2025 at the Cinecittà World in Rome. Thirty-seven contestants from different regions of Italy competed for the right to represent the country in the parent stage, Miss Grand International 2025.

The contest was won by a 25-year-old model and dancer, Elisa Crocchianti, representing the region of Lazio. Elisa later represented Italy internationally in the parent stage held in Bangkok, Thailand, on 18 October 2025, but was unplaced.

The grand final of the pageant was hosted by Nicola Santini and Stefania Orlando.

== Selection of contestants ==
The contestants for this year's edition will be elected via regional pageants organized by different local coordinators, who, in some cases, are responsible for more than one region. The following is a list of regions that held their regional preliminary pageants for Miss Grand Italy 2025.

Pageant	Edition	Regional finals		Entrants (Note: Both Miss and Mascot Categories)	Ref.
Pageant	Edition	Date	Venue	Entrants	Ref.
Miss Paradisia (Note: Two finalists were elected as the representatives of Piedmont and Aosta Valley for the Miss Grand Italy 2025 national contest.)	—N/a	21 Jun	Mitho nightclub, Piobesi Torinese, TO	31	
Miss Grand Liguria	4th	28 Jun	Rivera Bread & Bakery, Sampierdarena, GE	5	
Miss Grand Apulia	5th	29 Jun	Villa dei Sogni, Martina Franca, TA	50	
Miss Grand Molise	2nd	29 Jun	Villa dei Sogni, Martina Franca, TA	50	
Miss Grand Sardinia	4th	11 Jul	Piazza Margherita Hack, Villasimius, SU	10	
Miss Grand Lombardy	3rd	12 Jul	Heden Café Milano, Milan, MI	6	
Miss Grand Umbria	7th	18 Jul	Neutro Sauvage, San Sisto, PG	20	
Miss Grand Campania	8th	2 Sep	Villa Domi, Naples, NA	24	
Miss Grand Basilicata	6th	2 Sep	Villa Domi, Naples, NA	24	
Miss Grand EMR	5th	25 Jul	Gnam - Bar & Cucina, Vigarano Mainarda, FE	11	
Miss Grand Sicily	7th	27 Aug	Piazza della Madonna della Catena, Castiglione di Sicilia	14	
Miss Grand Tuscany	5th	28 Aug	Aloha Wine Bar Restaurant, Follonica, GR	n/a	
Miss Grand Veneto	5th	5 Sep	Ristorante Sporting, Caorle, VE	n/a	
Miss Grand FVG	5th	5 Sep	Ristorante Sporting, Caorle, VE	n/a	
Miss Grand TAA	3rd	5 Sep	Ristorante Sporting, Caorle, VE	n/a	
Miss Grand Marche	5th	9 Sep	Locanda Di Villa Torraccia, Pesaro, PU	n/a	
Miss Grand Calabria	Two regional preliminary events was held on 28 December 2024 and 12 April 2025, but no information regarding the regional final competition.				
Miss Grand Abruzzo	No information regarding both the regional preliminary and the regional finals.				
Miss Grand Lazio	No information regarding both the regional preliminary and the regional finals.				

== Result ==
Miss Grand Italy 2025 competition result by region
Color key:
Winner	1st Runner-up
2nd Runner-up	Top 5
Top 10	Top 20
Unplaced	Withdrawals

Placement	Contestant
Winner	#33 Lazio – Elisa Crocchianti
1st runner-up	#34 Emilia-Romagna – Loretta Graziani
2nd runner-up	#5 Veneto – Sara De Lazzari
Top 5	#10 Molise – Corinne Castronovo; #11 Aosta Valley – Asia Frison
Top 10	#1 Lombardy – Sara Fernández; #22 Umbria – Leila Gatti; #26 Veneto – Arianna Musobelliu; #28 Calabria – Jessica Manago; #36 Campania – Rebecca Tulino
Top 20	#4 Trentino-Alto Adige/Südtirol – Giusy Guarino; #12 Piedmont – Selena Russo; #14 Lazio – Giulia Bianchi; #17 Sicily – Rita Caravella; #20 Emilia-Romagna – Sofia Gamberini; #24 Piedmont – Arianna Sgarbossa; #25 Apulia – Era Kalemi; #30 Campania – Annalisa Tretola; #32 Friuli-Venezia Giulia – Anastasia Del Vecchio; #37 Sardinia – Alessia Gatti

== Contestants ==
Color key

W Region-level pageant winner
R Region-level pageant runner-up
Q Contestant with unknown regional placement

Thirty-seven contestants have been confirmed.

1. W Lombardy – Sara Fernández
2. Q Lazio – Valentina Isopi
3. Q Campania – Fabiola Monaco
4. Q Trentino-Alto Adige/Südtirol – Giusy Guarino
5. Q Veneto – Sara De Lazzari
6. Q Friuli-Venezia Giulia – Lia Antonacci
7. W Marche – Aurora Bruni
8. Q Calabria – Chiara Plebani
9. Q Apulia – Aurora Fumarola
10. W Molise – Corinne Castronovo
11. R Aosta Valley – Asia Frison
12. R Piedmont – Selena Russo
13. Q Lombardy – Luana Rivas
14. Q Lazio – Giulia Bianchi
15. W Tuscany – Rebecca Biagioni
16. Q Basilicata – Sofia Greco
17. R Sicily – Rita Caravella
18. Q Abruzzo – Lilia Belgacem
19. Q Marche – Asia Moschini
20. W Emilia-Romagna – Sofia Gamberini
21. Q Tuscany – Katy Talocchini
22. R Umbria – Leila Gatti
23. Q Liguria – Jessica Zabala
24. Q Piedmont – Arianna Sgarbossa
25. Q Apulia – Era Kalemi
26. Q Veneto – Arianna Musobelliu
27. Q Friuli-Venezia Giulia – Jenny Borgobello
28. Q Calabria – Jessica Manago
29. R Umbria – Daniela Braga
30. Q Campania – Annalisa Tretola
31. Q Sardinia – Giulia Matta
32. Q Friuli-Venezia Giulia – Anastasia Del Vecchio
33. Q Lazio – Elisa Crocchianti
34. W Emilia-Romagna – Loretta Graziani
35. Q Sardinia – Rawen Ben Adallah
36. W Campania – Rebecca Tulino
37. Q Sardinia – Alessia Gatti

Withdrawals

1. W Apulia – Asia Tommasi
2. Q Apulia – Noemi Mazzone
3. W Emilia-Romagna – Soumia Chaire
4. W Liguria – Dayana Holguín
5. Q Lombardy – Aurora Gianello
6. R Sicily – Giusy Centi
7. W Umbria – Yasmine Sekrouf

== List of regional coordinators ==
The following is a list of the 2025 Miss Grand Italy regional licensees.

- Abruzzo: Marcello Venditti
- Aosta Valley: Giuseppe Berlier (1)
- Apulia: Giuseppe Romanelli
- Basilicata: Franco Capasso (1)
- Calabria: Luigi Caruso
- Campania: Franco Capasso (2)
- Emilia-Romagna: Anna Bertelli
- Friuli-Venezia Giulia: Lucia Fort
- Lazio: Agostino Fraccascia
- Liguria: Susanna Almeida
- Lombardy: Alexandra Moreno
- Marche: Francesca Guidi
- Molise: Franco Capasso (3)
- Piedmont: Giuseppe Berlier (2)
- Sardinia: Saily Bello Contreras
- Sicily: Giuseppe Caggegi
- Trentino-South Tyrol: Domenico Poggiana (1)
- Tuscany: Giuliano Caliaro
- Umbria: Likhane Tape Zokou
- Veneto: Domenico Poggiana (2)
