= Miss Grand Italy 2024 =

6th Miss Grand Italy competition, beauty pageant edition

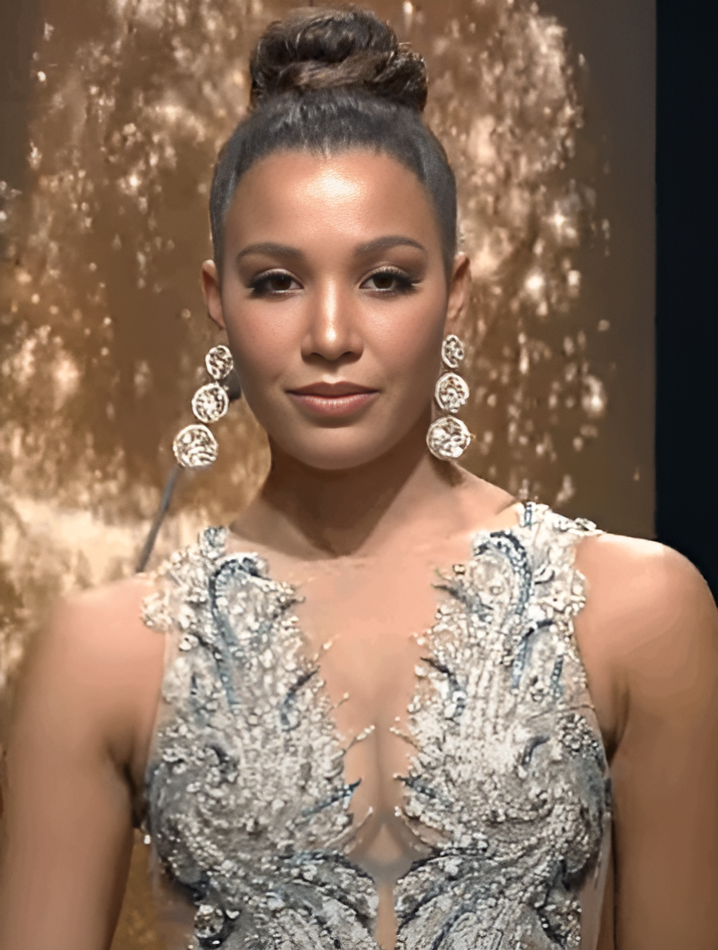
- Micaela Vietto, the winner of the contest
- Date: 1 September 2024
- Presenters: Nathaly Cardonazzo; Beppe Convertini
- Venue: Teatro 1, Cinecittà World, Rome
- Broadcaster: Sky; Canale Italia
- Entrants: 39
- Placements: 20
- Winner: Micaela Vietto (Piedmont)

Miss Grand Italy 2024 or Miss Grand International Italy 2024 was the sixth edition of the Miss Grand Italy pageant, held in Rome on 1 September 2024, in the Teatro 1 of Cinecittà World. Thirty-nine contestants from 20 regions of Italy competed for the title.

At the end of the event, a 29-year-old of Italian-Brazilian model representing Piedmont, Micaela Vietto, was announced the winner. Micaela later represented Italy at the Miss Grand International 2024 pageant, held in Thailand on 25 October 2024, but was unplaced.

The event was hosted by two Italian television personalities Nathaly Cardonazzo and Beppe Convertini, and was relay-broadcast on two television channels Sky and Canale Italia.

== Background ==
=== Date and venue ===
It was announced on the organizer's official Facebook that 2024 Miss Grand Italy competition was scheduled from 28 August to 1 September 2024, at the Cinecittà World in Rome.

=== Selection of contestants ===
All national finalists for Miss Grand Italy were elected through regional pageants held by different local organizers. Some region also organized local preliminary selection to determine the final candidates for their regional finals. Unlike the Miss Grand regional pageant system in other countries, the number of contestants from each region qualified for the national contest could be more than one; some regions also organized the grand final round more than once for this year's competition.

The following is the list of the Miss Grand Italy 2024 preliminary stages by region.

Host region	Date	Qualifier(s) (Note: Only the Miss category (age 17–28); some qualified contestants later withdrew)	Ref.
Abruzzo	N/A	1 winner	
Aosta Valley	No regional final held in the region		
Apulia	23 June 2024	1 winner, 2 RUs	
Basilicata	No regional final held in the region		
Calabria	No regional final held in the region		
Campania	13 August 2023	5 qualifiers	
Campania	14 July 2024	5 qualifiers	
Campania	22 August 2024 (Note: As regional final for Campania and Basilicata.)	5 qualifiers	
Emilia-Romagna	28 July 2024	4 quaifiers	
Emilia-Romagna	17 August 2024	4 quaifiers	
Friuli-Venezia Giulia	14 July 2024	1 winner	
Lazio	26 July 2024	1 winner, 2 RUs	
Liguria	28 July 2024	2 winners, 1 RU	

Host region	Date	Qualifier(s)	Ref.
Lombardy	No regional final held in the region		
Marche	18 August 2024	1 winner, 2 RUs	
Molise	No regional final held in the region		
Piedmont	20 July 2024 (Note: As regional final for Aosta Valley and Piedmont.)	2 winners, 3 RUs	
Sardinia	25 August 2024	1 winner, 2 RUs	
Sicily	16 August 2024 (Note: As regional final for Sicily and Calabria.)	2 winners, 2 RUs	
Trentino-South Tyrol	No regional final held in the region		
Tuscany	11 August 2024	1 winner, 1 RU	
Umbria	26 July 2021	1 winner, 2 RUs	
Veneto	1 October 2023	2 winners, 2 RUs	
Note: RU = Runner-up

== Results ==
Miss Grand Italy 2024 competition result by region
Color key:
Winner	1st RU	2nd RU
3rd RU	4th RU	Top 10
Top 20	Unplaced	Withdrew
RU = Runner-up

External videos
- Grand Final competition

Placement	Delegate
Miss Grand Italy 2024	22. Piedmont – Micaela Vietto
1st runner-up	23. Apulia – Veronica Corrente
2nd runner-up	24. Veneto – Anna Toniutti
3rd runner-up	26. Campania – Krystyn Soares
4th runner-up	01. Piedmont – Daniele Jimenez
Top 10	02. Emilia-Romagna – Virginia Rocchi; 16. Trentino-South Tyrol – Emma Paolino; 18. Aosta Valley – Iana Munich Ferreira; 28. Sicily – Miriana Nunnari; 39. Sardinia – Arije Bejaoui
Top 20	03. Veneto – Malak Bluouzza; 10. Lazio – Morgana Nuccio; 11. Abruzzo – Lucia Amanti; 12. Molise – Cristina Colangelo; 17. Basilicata – Francesca Finelli; 34. Lazio – Emanuela Mari; 35. Liguria – Liz Michela Garcìa; 36. Emilia-Romagna – Nour El Idrissi; 37. Umbria – Giulia Propersi; 38. Piedmont – Valentina Filippi

== Contestants ==
Color key

For qualification procedure:	For national placement:
W Region-level pageant winner	Winner
R Region pageant's runner-up	Runner-up
Q Contestant with unknown regional placement

Initially, forty-two contestants were confirmed, but three withdrew making the final of 39 contestants.

Number	Region	Contestant	Age (Note: Ages at the time of the pageant)	Hometown	Ref.
01.	Piedmont	R Daniele Jimenez		Turin	
02.	Emilia-Romagna	R Virginia Rocchi	18	Cesena	
03.	Veneto	Q Malak Bluouzza	19		
04.	Campania	R Fiamma Simonelli			
05.	Apulia	R Sofia Galluzzo		Oria	
06.	Sardinia	Q Rawen Ben Adallah			
07.	Liguria	R Selena Muraca	18	Genoa	
08.	Tuscany	W Sara Gobbini	20	Follonica	
09.	Marche	W Caterina Baldini	19	Agugliano	
10.	Lazio	W Morgana Nuccio			
11.	Abruzzo	Q Lucia Amanti	22	Asciano	
12.	Molise	Q Cristina Colangelo			
13.	Friuli-Venezia Giulia	Q Evi Graziano			
14.	Sicily	R Vittoria Triscari	23	Cesarò	
15.	Calabria	R Gaia Travaglianti	18	Cesarò	
16.	Trentino-South Tyrol	Q Emma Paolino	18		
17.	Basilicata	R Francesca Finelli			
18.	Aosta Valley	W Iana Munich Ferreira	21	Turin	
19.	Lombardy	W Sofia Sgarrino			
20.	Tuscany	R Caterina Allocco	20	Bra	
21.	Emilia-Romagna	R Lucía Rombolá	20	Cervia	
22.	Piedmont	W Micaela Vietto	29	Farigliano	
23.	Apulia	W Veronica Corrente			
24.	Veneto	Q Anna Toniutti			
25.	Marche	R Emma Brandt			
26.	Campania	W Krystyn Soares	26	Pozzuoli	
27.	Basilicata	W Doriana Nigro	26		
28.	Sicily	W Miriana Nunnari	18	Messina	
29.	Lazio	Q Aurora Fipaldini			
30.	Sardinia	Q Gaia Riva			
31.	Apulia	R Irene Dell'Anna			
32.	Veneto	Q Arianna Musubelliu			
33.	Marche	R Alice Battazza	21	Pesaro	
34.	Lazio	Q Emanuela Mari			
35.	Liguria	W Liz Michela Garcìa	18	Genoa	
36.	Emilia-Romagna	W Nour El Idrissi	20	Modena	
37.	Umbria	R Giulia Propersi			
38.	Piedmont	R Valentina Filippi		Carrù	
39.	Sardinia	Q Arije Bejaoui	17	Villasimius	

Withdrawns

- R Emilia-Romagna – Giulia Berretti
- R Piedmont – Arianna Risso
- W Umbria – Giada Preziuso
- R Umbria – Arianna Pizzoni

== List of regional licensees ==
The following is a list of the 2024 Miss Grand Italy regional licensees.

- Abruzzo: Marcello Venditti
- Aosta Valley: Giuseppe Berlier
- Apulia: Giuseppe Romanelli
- Basilicata: Franco Capasso (1)
- Calabria: Giuseppe Caggegi (1)
- Campania: Franco Capasso (2)
- Emilia-Romagna: Carmelo Tornatore
- Friuli-Venezia Giulia: Mattia Baici
- Lazio: Alessandra Fattoruso
- Liguria: Monica Jordan (1)
- Lombardy: Monica Jordan (2)
- Marche: Francesca Guidi
- Molise: Franco Capasso (3)
- Piedmont: Union Model Company
- Sardinia: Saily Bello Contreras
- Sicily: Giuseppe Caggegi (2)
- Trentino-South Tyrol: Domenico Poggiana (1)
- Tuscany: Giuliano Caliaro
- Umbria: Manuel Pauselli
- Veneto: Domenico Poggiana (2)
