= Miss Grand Italy =

Italian female beauty contest

- Formation: 10 September 2019; 7 years ago
- Founder: Giuseppe Puzio
- Type: Beauty pageant
- Headquarters: Benevento
- Location: Italy
- Official language: Italian
- National Director: Giuseppe Puzio
- Parent organization: MUPI SRL. (2019–present); Venus Dea (2015–2016); Gateway Celebrities Management (2013–2014)
- Affiliations: Miss Grand International
- Website: Official website

Miss Grand Italy (Italian: Miss Grand Italia) or Miss Grand International Italy is a national female beauty pageant in Italy, held annually since 2019, aiming to select the country representative for Miss Grand International, which is an annual international beauty pageant promoting World Peace and against all kinds of conflicts. The pageant has been being managed by a Benevento-based event organizer MUPI SRL., chaired by Giuseppe Puzio, since its establishment.

Since the establishment of Miss Grand International, to date, Italy representatives have never won the contest. The current titleholder is Marika Nardoz of Lazio, who was crowned on 26 September 2021 at Cinecittà World in Rome, outclassing other 39 finalists.

== Background ==
=== History ===
Before the franchise acquiring of the current Italian national director Giuseppe Puzio in 2019, Italy has ever sent its representatives to compete at the Miss Grand international three times, including Katarina Chabrecekova in 2013, Maria Grazia Murazzani in 2015, and Martina Corrias in 2016. However, all mentioned representatives have been appointed to the position by different licensees. The inaugural edition of Miss Grand Italy was held under the leadership of Puzio in Benevento on 10 September and was broadcast nationwide via the Italian Satellite television channel, Sky Italia N° 180, in which Mirea Sorrentino from Pompei was announced the winner, outclassing 39 other finalists, and the contest has been held annually since then.

The national organizer has been franchising the regional competitions to individual agencies since their first edition in 2019, twelve regions held their regional pageants to select the national finalists for the first national edition, including Sicilia, Calabria, Basilicata, Campania, Molise, Lazio, Umbria, Marche, Trentino-Alto Adige, Veneto, Lombardia, and Sardegna. In 2020, due to the COVID-19 pandemic, the national participants was dropped to 24.

== Editions ==
The following list is the edition detail of the Miss Grand Italy contest, since its inception in 2019.

| Year | Edition | Date | Final venue | Entrants | Winner | Ref. |
|---|---|---|---|---|---|---|
| 2019 | 1st | 10 September | Il Triclinio del Fauno, Benevento, Campania | 40 | Basilicata – Mirea Sorrentino | |
| 2020 | 2nd | 11 October | Cinecittà World, Rome | 24 | Campania – Filomena Venuso | |
| 2021 | 3rd | 26 September | Cinecittà World, Rome | 40 | Lazio – Marika Nardozi | |
| 2022 | 4th | 18 September | Grand Hotel Pianeta Maratea, Maratea, Potenza | 39 | Apulia – Miriam Malerba | |
| 2023 | 5th | 11 June | Grand Hotel Pianeta Maratea, Maratea, Potenza | 45 | Aosta Valley – Andrea Zanettin | |
| 2024 | 6th | 1 September | Cinecittà World, Rome | 39 | Piedmont – Micaela Vietto | |
| 2025 | 7th | 14 September | Cinecittà World, Rome | 37 | Lazio – Elisa Crocchianti | |
| 2026 | 8th | 6 September | Cinecittà World, Rome | 30 | Aosta Valley – Angelica Marziali | |

== Contestant selection ==
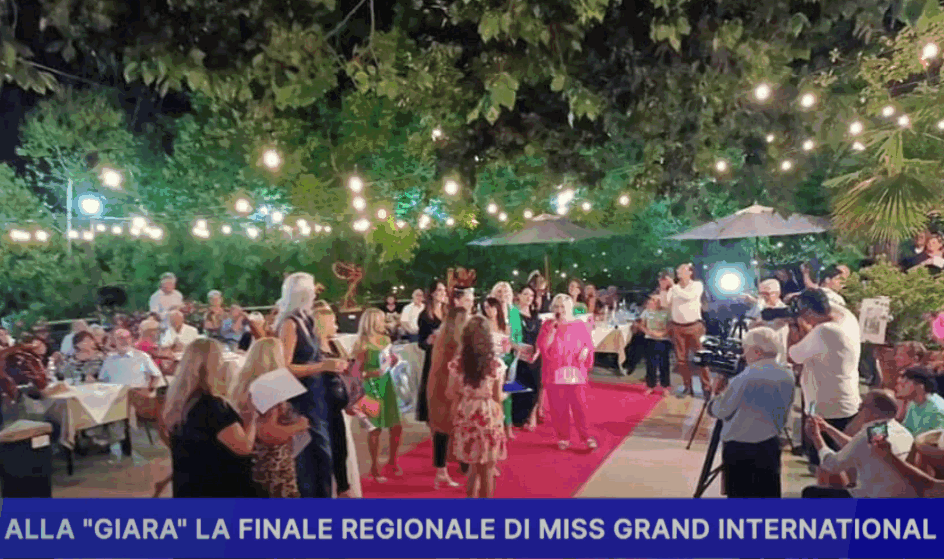
Miss Grand Italy region-level contest held in the Region of Marche on June 3, 2023, at the La Giara Ristorante Pizzeria, Pesaro.

Since its establishment in 2019, the national finalists' selection of the Miss Grand Italy has been operated via three systems, including:

- Multiplex regional pageant system, in which the regional franchisee conduct several local pageants or casting events to determine the finalists for their regional pageants, such as the contest of Emilia-Romagna region in 2021, where the regional organizer held three small contests and one casting event in Bagnolo in Piano, Rubiera, Campogalliano, and Modena.
- Simple regional pageant system, the regional pageant is held to select the national finalists with no lower pageants or casting events, the winner will be automatically qualified to the national stage.
- Central direct application through the national licensee, the organization then selects two candidates a month for the national pageant, beginning from February to August, via the online challenging events.

The selection summary process is shown below:

Miss Grand Italy national finalists selection procedure
(2019–present)

Stage/System
Stage 1
Stage 2
Stage 3

Multiplex Regional | Simple Regional
Local Pageant (s) | Local Casting (s)
Regional Pageant | Regional Pageant
National Pageant

Centrally Direct
Online Challenge (Note: The tract no longer existed since 2024)
2-3 Finalists/Month

=== Regional pageants ===
Since 2019, several regions have organized their local contests to select representatives to compete in the Miss Grand Italy pageant, as detailed below.

- Centre: 4 region-level pageants
  - Miss Grand Lazio (est. 2019)
  - Miss Grand Marche (est. 2021)
  - Miss Grand Tuscany (est. 2020)
  - Miss Grand Umbria (est. 2019)
- South: 6 region-level pageants
  - Miss Grand Abruzzo (est. 2022)
  - Miss Grand Apulia (est. 2021)
  - Miss Grand Basilicata (est. 2019)
  - Miss Grand Calabria (est. 2019)
  - Miss Grand Campania (est. 2019)
  - Miss Grand Molise (est. 2023)
- North-East: 4 region-level pageants
  - Miss Grand Emilia-Romagna (est. 2021)
  - Miss Grand Friuli-Venezia Giulia (est. 2021)
  - Miss Grand Trentino-South Tyrol (est. 2022)
  - Miss Grand Veneto (est. 2019)
- North-West: 3 region-level pageants
  - Miss Grand Liguria (est. 2022)
  - Miss Grand Lombardy (est. 2022)
  - Miss Grand Piedmont (est. 2024)
- Islands: 2 region-level pageant
  - Miss Grand Sardinia (est. 2019)
  - Miss Grand Sicily (est. 2019)

== International competition ==
The following is a list of Italian representatives at the Miss Grand International contest.

Color keys

- : Declared as the winner
- : Ended as a runner-up (Top 5)
- : Ended as a finalist (Top 10)
- : Ended as a semifinalist (Top 20/21)
- : Ended as special awards winner

| Year | Region | Miss Grand Italy | Title | Placement | Special Awards | National Director |
|---|---|---|---|---|---|---|
| 2026 | Aosta Valley | Angelica Marziali | Miss Grand Italy 2026 | TBA | | Giuseppe Puzio |
| 2025 | Lazio | Elisa Crocchianti | Miss Grand Italy 2025 | Unplaced | | Giuseppe Puzio |
| 2024 | Piedmont | Micaela Vietto | Miss Grand Italy 2024 | Unplaced | | Giuseppe Puzio |
| 2023 | Aosta Valley | Andrea Zanettin | Miss Grand Italy 2023 | Unplaced | | Giuseppe Puzio |
| 2022 | Apulia | Miriam Malerba | Miss Grand Italy 2022 | Unplaced | | Giuseppe Puzio |
| 2021 | Lazio | Marika Nardozi (Note: Later 1st runner-up Miss World Italy 2022.) | Miss Grand Italy 2021 | Unplaced | | Giuseppe Puzio |
| 2020 | Campania | Filomena Venuso | Miss Grand Italy 2020 | Unplaced | | Giuseppe Puzio |
| 2019 | Basilicata | Mirea Sorrentino | Miss Grand Italy 2019 | Unplaced | | Giuseppe Puzio |
Did not compete between 2017 - 2018
| 2016 | Sardegna | Martina Corrias | Eccellenze di Sardegna 2016 (Note: Also Eccellenze di Sardegna 2016.) | Unplaced | | Maurizio Ciaccio |
| 2015 | Sardegna | Maria Grazia Murazzani | Bellezza Italiana Porto Rotondo 2015 (Note: Also Bellezza Italiana Porto Rotondo 2015.) | Unplaced | | Maurizio Ciaccio |
| 2014 | Emilia-Romagna | Jennifer Casula | Miss Cinema 2013 (Note: Also Miss Cinema 2013.) | Did not compete | | Antonio Marzano |
| 2013 | Lazio | Katarina Chabrecekova | Finalist Miss World Italy | Unplaced | | Antonio Marzano |

== Winners' gallery ==
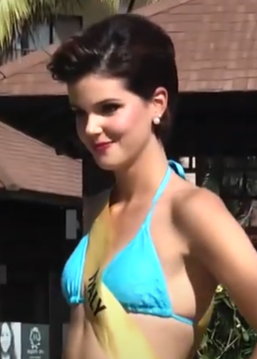
Maria Grazia Murazzani (2015)

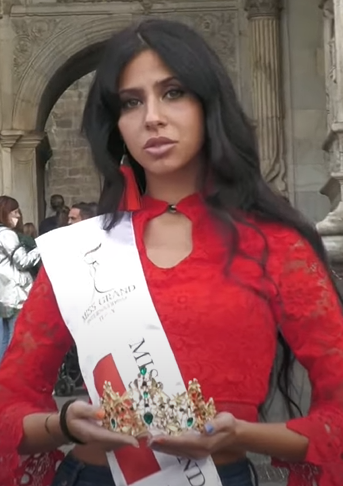
Marika Nardozi (2021)

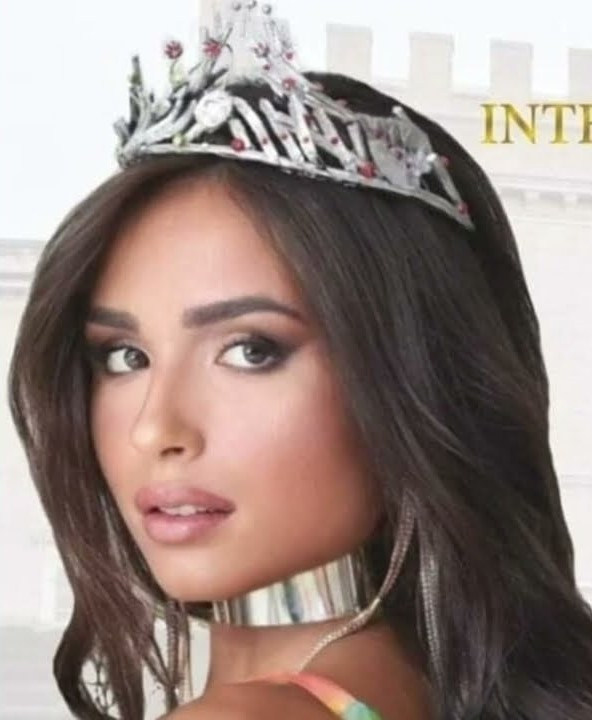
Miriam Malerba (2022)

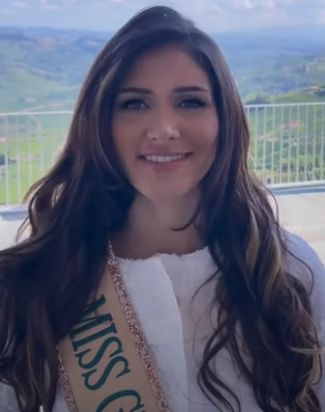
Andrea Zanettin (2023)

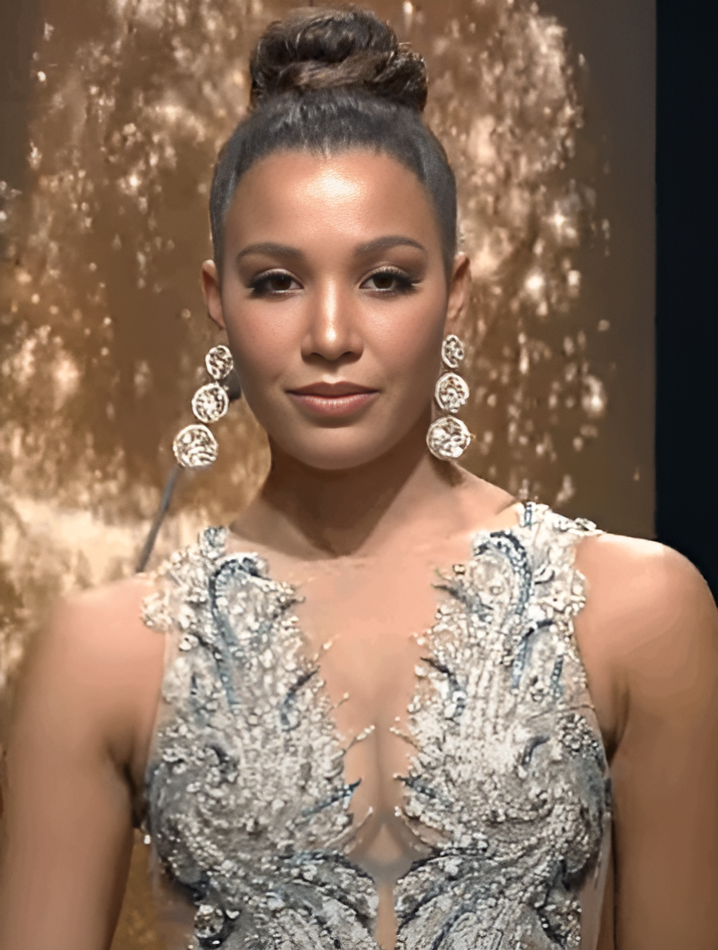
Micaela Vietto (2024)

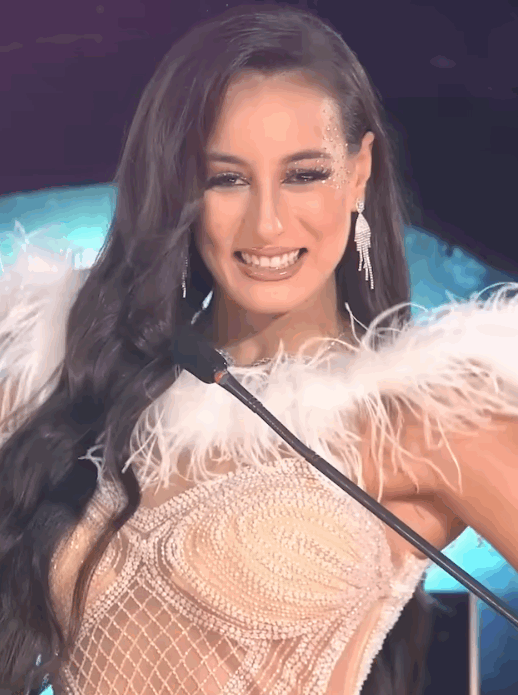
Elisa Crocchianti (2025)

Agelica Marziali (2026)
