= Miss Grand Italy 2023 =

5th Miss Grand Italy competition, beauty pageant edition

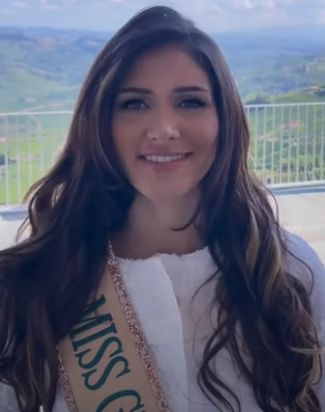
- Andrea Zanettin, the winner of the contest
- Date: 11 June 2023
- Presenters: Matilde Brandi; Pippo Pelo
- Venue: Grand Hotel Pianeta Maratea, Maratea, Potenza
- Broadcaster: Canale Italia; Sky UK
- Entrants: 45
- Placements: 24
- Winner: Andrea Zanettin (Aosta Valley)
- Mascot winner: Aurora Fretta (Campania)

Miss Grand Italy 2023 was the fifth edition of the Miss Grand Italy pageant, held on 11 June 2023, at the Grand Hotel Pianeta Maratea, in the Province of Potenza. Forty-five candidates from different regions of the country competed for the title, of whom a 24-year-old Venezuelan-Italian professional model representing Aosta Valley, Andrea Zanettin, was named the main winner, while a 14-year-old girl from Naples, Aurora Fretta, was announced the winner of the Mascot category.

The winner of the contest, Andrea Zanettin, was expected to represent the country at the international stage, Miss Grand International 2023, to be held in Vietnam on 25 October.

The grand gala final of the pageant was hosted by Matilde Brandi and Pippo Pelo, and was also attended by many television personalities, such as Rossella Erra, Pippo Franco, and Vincenzo Alighieri.

== Background ==
=== Selection of contestants ===
The national finalists of Miss Grand Italy 2023 were chosen by the regional organizers, entitled by the central organ MUPI SRL to select their representatives, through the regional pageants. Several regional organs held multiple audition events or local contests to determine the finalists for their regional pageant. For the autonomous region of Aosta Valley, which made its debut in Miss Grand Italy this year, the winner of an annual regional pageant, Miss Paradisia, will automatically qualify for the national pageant of Miss Grand Italy 2023.

In addition to the regional contests, the central organizer also arranged an online voting challenge to determine a challenging winner to automatically qualify for the national pageant; the challengers were divided into 13 group stages, in which the qualified applicants competed virtually for the duration of 14 to 15 days, after which the candidates with the most voting points qualified to the final challenging round and competed again to determine the final winner.

=== Regional pageants ===
Several regions hold their preliminary pageants to select their representatives for the national stage. In addition, a third-level contest (city-level) has also been observed, and the winners of such qualified for the regional contests.

The following list is the regions that organized the regional pageants for Miss Grand Italy 2023.

List of Miss Grand Italy 2023 regional and local pageants, by the grand final coronation date (as of 9 May 2023)
Region	Regional final date and venue	Numbers of				Ref.
Region	Regional final date and venue	Local preliminary events	Entrants	Qualified candidates		Ref.
Region	Regional final date and venue	Local preliminary events	Entrants	Miss (Age 17-28)	Mascotte (Age 13-16)	Ref.
Abruzzo	3 December 2022 at the Castello Orsini-Odescalchi, Avezzano (AQ)	—N/a	N/A	1	1	
Tuscany	24 April 2023 at the Lido Le Panteraie Club, Montecatini Terme (PT)	2 events: January 5: Montecatini Terme (PT); April 24: Montecatini Terme (PT)	30	4	1	
Sardinia	6 May 2023 at the La Terrazza Domus Restaurant, Villasimius (SU)	3 events: 22 December 2022: Sassari (SS); February 25: Cagliari (CA); March 25: Nuoro (NU)	N/A	3	2	
Apulia	7 May 2023 at the Castello Spagnolo, Statte (TA)	4 events: 10 December 2022: Martina Franca (TA); January 28: Cerignola (FG); March 14: Melissano (LE); May 7: Taranto (TA)	N/A	3	3	
Liguria	27 May 2023 at the Holiday Inn Genoa City, Genoa (GE)	2 events: 18 December 2022: Genoa (GE); March 24: Genoa (GE)	N/A	3	0	
Lombardy	27 May 2023 at the Holiday Inn Genoa City, Genoa (GE)	1 event: 10 December 2022: Bergamo (BG)	N/A	3	0	
Trentino-Alto Adige	28 May 2023 at Hotel Villa Pigalle, Belvedere (VI)	2 events: April 1: Vicenza (VI); May 6: Padua (PD)	No data available			
Friuli Venezia Giulia	28 May 2023 at Hotel Villa Pigalle, Belvedere (VI)	2 events: April 1: Vicenza (VI); May 6: Padua (PD)	N/A	1	0	
Veneto	28 May 2023 at Hotel Villa Pigalle, Belvedere (VI)	2 events: April 1: Vicenza (VI); May 6: Padua (PD)	N/A	6	0	
Umbria	1 June 2023 at the Da Faliero e la Maria Restaurant, Montebuono (RI)	3 events: 25 November 2022: Assisi (PG); March 17: Umbertide (PG); May 6: Padua (PD)	N/A	3	1	
Calabria	2 June 2023 at the Village Camping Due Elle, Corigliano-Rossano (CS)	3 events: February 12: Castrovillari (CS); March 19: Corigliano-Rossano (CS); May 12: Corigliano-Rossano (CS)	No data available			
Campania	3 June 2023 at the Via Madre Teresa di Calcutta, San Martino Valle Caudina (AV)	3 events: April 2: Ceppaloni (BN); April 28: Naples (NA); May 1: Naples (NA)	N/A	2	2	
Molise	3 June 2023 at the Via Madre Teresa di Calcutta, San Martino Valle Caudina (AV)	3 events: April 2: Ceppaloni (BN); April 28: Naples (NA); May 1: Naples (NA)	N/A	1	2	
Basilicata	3 June 2023 at the Via Madre Teresa di Calcutta, San Martino Valle Caudina (AV)	3 events: April 2: Ceppaloni (BN); April 28: Naples (NA); May 1: Naples (NA)	N/A	1	2	
Emilia-Romagna	3 June 2023 at the Bikini Disco Dinner Club, Cattolica (RN)	—N/a	25	3	4	
Marche	3 June 2023 at La Giara Restaurant, Pesaro (PU)	—N/a	17	2	2	
Sicilia	3 June 2023 at the Jaaneta Beach Club, Giardini Naxos (ME)	—N/a	N/A	3	3	
Aosta Valley	4 June 2023 at the Grand Hotel Billia-Saint Vincent, Saint-Vincent (AO)	3 events: 19 December 2022: Verrès; February 4: Verrès; April 22: San Sebastiano da Po	16	2	0	
Lazio	No data available	1 event: May 7: Colleferro (RM)	No data available			
Piemonte	No data available	No data available				

== Candidates ==
The following list is the candidates who have been confirmed to participate, categorized by region.

Team Abruzzo	Team Aosta Valley	Team Apulia	Team Basilicata
Miss category: Adele Mariani; Mascotte category: Giorgia Tacchia	Miss category: Giorgia Giacobbe; Andrea Zanettin	Miss category: Marika Giannattasio; Alessia D'Argenio; Claudia Cristofalo; Mascotte category: Alessia Andriani; Desireè Fasciano; Arianna De Bernardis	Miss category: Lucia Pia Vitolo; Mascotte category: Rebecca Tulino; Chiara Cioffi
Team Calabria	Team Campania	Team Emilia-Romagna	Team Friuli Venezia Giulia
	Miss category: Rossella Crisci; Clara Fiore; Cinzia Angelino; Lucia Pia Vitolo; Carmen Pesa^{[α]}; Mascotte category: Aurora Fretta; Virginia Pepillo	Miss category: Loretta Graziani; Viola Missiroli; Vittoria Alvino; Mascotte category: Giulia Berretti; Vittoria Chiarini; Gioia Parente; Emily Arpino	Miss category: Emma Paolino
Team Lazio	Team Liguria	Team Lombardy	Team Marche
Miss category: Veronica Corrente	Miss category: Milena Acosta Yepez; Aya Blluomu; Dayanancy Pena	Miss category: Jessica Chanel Grigolato; Alessia Gatti; Lala Calvi; Giulia Bianchi	Miss category: Pesaro Cecilia Rinaldi; Clarissa Cola; Mascotte category: Sara Arduini; Beatrice Georgiana Gregorescu
Team Molise	Team Piemonte	Team Sardinia	Team Sicilia
Miss category: Manuela Leopaldi; Mascotte category: Angelina Lyubenko; Rita Scognamiglio	Miss category: Asia Frison	Miss category: Elisa Sechi; Martina Serra; Jasmin Rahbar; Lobna Ibba; Mascotte category: Alessia Mulas; Silvia Baldino	Miss category: Julieta herrera; Jennifer Lo Piero; Lidia Castorina; Maria Bruna Alleruzzo
Team Trentino-Alto Adige	Team Tuscany	Team Umbria	Team Veneto
	Miss category: Giulia Cashaj; Morgana Manuali; Noemi Robes; Jennyfer Gervasi; Mascotte category: Emma Cantelli	Miss category: Yasmine Seckruf; Francesca Crulli; Sharon Chukwurah; Mascotte category: Jennifer Mery Coulibaly	Miss category: Anna Toniutti; Arianna Musobelliu; Eleonora Perusin; Serena Forzutti; Stefania Carausu; Valentina Fabbri
Note: 1. ^α: Directly qualified for the national contest after winning a voting challenge held online by the central licensee.
