= Miss Grand Italy 2022 =

4th Miss Grand Italy competition, beauty pageant edition

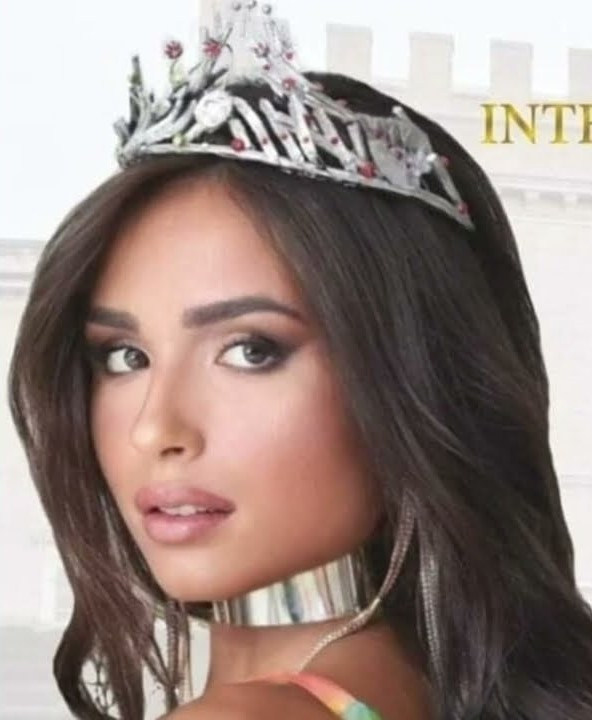
- Miriam Malerba, the winner of the contest
- Date: 18 September 2022
- Presenters: Beppe Convertini; Ainett Stephens
- Venue: Grand Hotel Pianeta Maratea, Maratea, Potenza
- Entrants: 39
- Winner: Miriam Malerba (Apulia)
- Miss Glamour Italy: Vanessa Ortiz (Lombardy)
- Miss Mascot: Giada Cinquegrana (Campania)

External videos
- Miss Grand Italy 2022 Grand Final Competition, on 13 December 2022, YouTube video

Miss Grand Italy 2022 was the fourth edition of the Miss Grand Italy beauty pageant, held from 14 – 18 September 2022 at Grand Hotel Pianeta Maratea, Maratea in the Province of Potenza. Thirty-nine contestants chosen by various local organizers through their regional pageant competed for the title, of which an eighteen-year-old girl Miriam Malerba from Apulia was named the winner. Malerba later represented the country at the international competition, Miss Grand International 2022, held in Bali and Jakarta, Indonesia on 25 October. but got non-placement.

In addition to the main winner, Giada Cinquegrana of Campania was named Miss Mascot, awarded to contestants aged between 13 – 16 years old, and Vanessa Ortiz of Lombardy was elected Miss Glamour International Italy. The event was broadcast on Canale Italia Sky channel 821, and hosted by Beppe Convertini and Ainett Stephens.

== Background ==
=== History ===
After finishing the 2021 national competition session in Rome, the pageant organizer – MUPI SRL. – subsequently franchising the 2022 license to each regional licensee; the first local pageant to select the candidates for the regional contest was happening in early December in Abruzzo, followed by several local pageants held in each region countrywide. The venue of the final national competition, Grand Hotel Pianetamaratea of Maratea, was later announced in May 2022.

=== Participants selection ===
The national finalists of Miss Grand Italy 2022 were chosen by the regional organizers, entitled by the central organ MUPI SRL to select their representatives, through the regional pageants. Several regional organs held multiple audition events or local contests to determine the finalists for their regional pageant, e.g., 5 local pageants and 1 audition were held in the Emilia-Romagna region. Similar to the national pageant, the regional contest of Miss Grand Italy is also divided into two categories including (1) the Main category for contestants aged between 17 – 28 years old, the winner of which will compete for the Miss Grand Italy title at the national stage, and (2) a mascot category for the contestants aged between 13 – 16 years old, the winner will also enter the same national stage with the senior category but the national winner will not be sent to compete in any international pageant.

Only one delegate, Alessia Stissi of Sicily, was directly elected by the national organizer through online voting from 1 February to 31 August on the official website. For such a process, each regional representative, who registered via online registration, was allocated into a group of 15 – 18, 12 groups in total. The winner of each group was determined through public voting on the organizer's website, the contestant with the most vote in each group qualified for the final voting round to select a final winner to compete in the national final stage.

=== Regional pageant ===
Map shows pageant-held regions in Miss Grand Italy 2022 national finalists selection process
Color keys for the number of pageant-related events held in the region, regional final round included.

7 Events 4 Events 3 Events National pageant	2 Events 1 Event No pageant-held region

List of Miss Grand Italy 2022 regional and local pageants, by regions
Region	Level	Date & Venue	Entrants	Qualified candidates	Ref.
Abruzzo	Local contest	5 December 2021 at Orsini-Colonna Castle, Avezzano (AQ)	16	5 regional finalists	
Abruzzo	Regional final	4 September 2022 at Piazza Risorgimento, Avezzano (AQ)	15	4 national finalists	
Calabria	Local contest	2 April 2022 at Fralex Restaurant, Corigliano-Rossano (CS)	20	4 regional finalists	
Calabria	Local contest	3 June 2022 at Village Camping Due Elle, Corigliano Calabro (CS)	16	4 regional finalists	
Calabria	Regional final	23 August 2022 at Tropix Restaurant, Corigliano-Rossano (CS)	N/A	1 national finalist	
Campania	Local contest	26 June 2022 at Relais Il Feudo, Trocchia, Benevento (BN)	N/A	6 regional finalists	
Campania	Local contest	10 July 2022 in San Martino Valle Caudina (AV)	N/A	6 regional finalists	
Campania	Local contest	23 July 2023 at Villa Domi, Naples (NA)	20	6 regional finalists	
Campania	Regional final	9 September 2022 at Terme Jacobelli, Telese Terme (BN)	—N/a	9 national finalists	
Emilia-Romagna	Local casting	26 February 2022 at Glamour Five Agency, Modena (MO)	N/A		
Emilia-Romagna	Local contest	1 April 2022 at La Corte 3.0 Restaurant Pizzeria, Rubiera (RE)	15	3 regional finalists	
Emilia-Romagna	Local contest	10 April 2022 at La Corte 3.0 Restaurant Pizzeria, Rubiera (RE)	10	3 regional finalists	
Emilia-Romagna	Local contest	18 May 2022 at Arena 2.0, Formigine (MO)	N/A	3 regional finalists	
Emilia-Romagna	Local contest	15 July 2022 at Ca' Marta Music & Fun, Sassuolo (MO)	14	5 regional finalists	
Emilia-Romagna	Local contest	31 July 2022 at Ristorante la Plaza, Formigine (MO)	9	5 regional finalists	
Emilia-Romagna	Regional final	4 September at La Corte 3.0 Restaurant Pizzeria, Rubiera (RE)	N/A	4 nationalfinalists	
Friuli Venezia Giulia	Regional final	2 September 2022 at Tavagnacco City Park, Tavagnacco (UD)	N/A	1 national finalist	
Lazio	Local contest	9 July 2022 at Tenuta delle Driadi, Cassino (FR)	N/A		
Lazio	National casting	15 July 2022 at Super 8 nightclub, Via del Barco, 7 Tivoli (RM)	N/A		
Lazio	Regional final	8 September at Piazza Italia Shopping Center, Colleferro (RM)	N/A	3 national finalists	
Liguria	Local contest	10 July 2022 at Dance Art Proget, Vallecrosia (IM)	N/A	7 regional finalists	
Liguria	Local contest	23 July 2022 at Green Charity Party, Villa Domi, Naples (NA)	N/A	7 regional finalists	
Liguria	Regional final	Conjugated held with the regional final contest of Miss Grand Lazio 2022 in Rome.			
Lombardy	Local contest	3 July 2022 at Just VIP Luxury Bar, Ponte San Pietro (BG)	20	5 regional finalists	
Lombardy	Local contest	30 July 2022 at Via L. Da Vinci 27, Stezzano (BG)	20	5 regional finalists	
Lombardy	Local contest	27 August 2022 at Heden Caffe, Milan (MI)	20	5 regional finalists	
Lombardy	Regional final	4 September 2022 at Bergamo Party Club, Bergamo (BG)	N/A	2 national finalists	
Marche	Regional final	27 August 2022 at La Giara restaurant, Pesaro (PU)	N/A	4 National finalists	
Puglia	Local contest	26 February 2022 at Artemisia Restaurant, Santo Spirito, Bari (BA)	20	6 regional finalists	
Puglia	Local contest	28 May 2022 at PIPER Lounge Bar, Santo Spirito, Bari, (BA)	N/A	9 regional finalists	
Puglia	Local contest	24 July 2022 at Il Rifugio del Re Gastropub, Massafra (TA)	N/A	9 regional finalists	
Puglia	Regional final	25 August 2022 at Villa Dei Sogni, Martina Franca (TA)	N/A	2 national finalists	
Trentino-South Tyrol	Regional final	Conjugated held with the regional final contest of Miss Grand Veneto 2022 in Sommacampagna.			
Tuscany	Local contest	27 May 2022 at Blue Team Amusement park, Arezzo (AR)	20	6 regional finalists	
Tuscany	Local contest	29 July 2022 at Bagno Balena beach club, Viareggio (LU)	20	6 regional finalists	
Tuscany	Regional final	27 August 2022 at Via Marconi, 33 Gavorrano (GR)	N/A	1 national finalist	
Umbria	Local contest	11 June 2022 at Marsciano Tennis Club, Marsciano (PG)	18	4 regional finalists	
Umbria	Local contest	21 June 2022 at Matteotti Square, Città di Castello (PG)	N/A		
Umbria	Local contest	28 June 2022 at Garibaldi Square, Assisi (PG)	N/A		
Umbria	Regional final	28 July 2022 at Santa Maria degli Angeli, Assisi (PG)	N/A	4 national finalists	
Veneto	Local contest	29 April 2022 at Villa Italia, Padua (PD)	16	10 regional finalists	
Veneto	Local contest	12 June 2022 at Picoverde Water Park, Sommacampagna (VR)	14	3 regional finalists	
Veneto	Local contest	30 July 2022 at Palco Via Roma 20, Piove di Sacco (PD)	20	6 regional finalists	
Veneto	Regional final	3 September 2022 at Picoverde water park, Sommacampagna (VR)	N/A	3 national finalists	

=== National online voting ===
Color key

Qualified to the national final round

Group stage (1 February – 31 July)					Final round (1 – 31 August)	
Group	Duration of voting	Entrants	Winner(s)	Ref.	Points	Rank
1	1 – 14 February	16 regional representatives	Lazio – Giorgia Le Grottaglie		44	4th
2	15 – 28 February	16 regional representatives	Calabria – Melissa Pizzurro		0	15th
3	1 – 15 March	16 regional representatives	Lazio – Aurora Contini		1	12th
3	1 – 15 March	16 regional representatives	Sicily – Alessia Stissi		131	1st place, gold medalist(s)
4	16 – 31 March	15 regional representatives	Marche – Alice Afanasii		1	12th
5	1 – 15 April	15 regional representatives	Basilicata – Alessandra Della Femmina		2	11th
6	16 – 30 April	15 regional representatives	Veneto – Aurora Maglione		3	8th
7	2 – 16 May	17 regional representatives	Puglia – Emanuela Costantino		1	12th
8	17 – 31 May	16 regional representatives	Puglia – Melissa Macchiusi		3	8th
8	17 – 31 May	16 regional representatives	Umbria – Andrea Lavinia Marcu		3	8th
9	1 – 15 June	17 regional representatives	Campania – Alessia Sacco		88	2nd place, silver medalist(s)
10	16 – 30 June	17 regional representatives	Puglia – Aicha Vergari		17	5th
11	1 – 15 July	17 regional representatives	Marche – Giulia Giorgini		69	3rd place, bronze medalist(s)
12	16 – 31 July	18 regional representatives	Emilia-Romagna – Sophia Blanca Schettino		14	7th

== Results summary ==
=== Placement ===
Final results	Contestant
Miss Grand Italy 2022	Apulia – Miriam Malerba
1st Runner-up	Abruzzo – Maria Carmen Crescenzi
2nd Runner-up	Lazio – Sofia Moscatelli
Top 10	No data available

== Candidates ==
42 delegates have been confirmed to compete for the national title of Miss Grand Italy 2022.

=== Main category ===
Region	Contestant	Age	Ref.
Abruzzo	Alessia Mancini		
Abruzzo	Maria Carmen Crescenzi		
Aosta Valley	Giulia Bianchi		
Apulia	Miriam Malerba	18	
Apulia	Angela Caputo		
Apulia	Marika Giannattasio		
Basilicata	Azzurra Grossi		
Basilicata	Rossana Morra		
Calabria	Denisa Christina Orzoi		
Campania	Lucia Pia Vitolo	20	
Campania	Giulia Aprea		
Campania	Bianca Mancino		
Campania	Emanuela Leopaldi		
Emilia-Romagna	Carol Malagoli		
Emilia-Romagna	Hilary Frattoluso		
Emilia-Romagna	Sophia Blanca Schettino		
Emilia-Romagna	Greta Gamberini		
Friuli-Venezia Giulia	Giorgia De Marchi	23	
Friuli-Venezia Giulia	Nicole Parrano		
Lazio	Sofia Moscatelli		
Lazio	Fabiana Paris		
Lazio	Giorgia Legrottaglie		
Liguria	Melissa Yucel		
Lombardy	Migena Hoxha		
Lombardy	Vanessa Ortiz		
Lombardy	Cinzia Montagnoli		
Marche	Tamara Etchevery	23	
Molise	Francesca Esposito		
Molise	Manuela Leopaldi		
Piedmont	Giulia Sterrantino		
Sicily	Alessia Stissi		
Trentino-Alto Adige/Südtirol	Andrea Parisi		
Trentino-Alto Adige/Südtirol	Gioia Temporin		
Trentino-Alto Adige/Südtirol	Alessandra D'este		
Tuscany	Melissa Mary Riva		
Tuscany	Elisa Bricchi		
Umbria	Sofia Monetti		
Umbria	Eleonora Giuvili		
Umbria	Yasmine Sekrouf		
Veneto	Selma Aingound		
Veneto	Evelina Rezheenskaya		
Veneto	Alessia Alberti		

=== Mascot category ===
Region	Contestant	Age	Ref.
Campania	Giada Cinquegrana	16	
Campania	Sabina Faccadio		
Campania	Vanessa Cinquegrana		
Campania	Valentina Avverso		
Campania	Flavia Ingrosso		
Marche	Giulia Damiani	15	
Marche	Gioia Parente	14	
Marche	Sara Canapini	15	
Umbria	Eleonora Giulivi		
Umbria	Sofia Sanytska		
Umbria	Yasmine Sekrouf		
