= Miss Grand Emilia-Romagna =

- Formation: 17 September 2021; 5 years ago
- Founder: Nicola Coccoli; Slavka Nanona
- Headquarters: Cesenatico
- Location: Italy
- Members: Miss Grand Italy
- Official language: Italian
- Director: Nicola Coccoli; Slavka Nanona (2021–2022); Carmelo Tornatore (2023–2024)

Miss Grand Emilia-Romagna is an Italian regional female beauty pageant, founded in 2021 by Nicola Coccoli and Slavka Nanona. The winners of the contest represent the region of Emilia-Romagna in the Miss Grand Italy national pageant.

Since the inception of the Miss Grand Italy pageant, Emilia-Romagna candidates have never won the contest yet; the highest placement they obtained was the top 10 finalist, won by Sophia Blanca Schettino in 2022.

== History ==
The Miss Grand Emilia-Romagna pageant was organized for the first time by local organizers Nicola Coccoli and Slavka Nanona on 17 September 2021. The contest consisted of 11 finalists who qualified for the region-level pageant through local auditions held in Rubiera, Bagnolo in Piano, and Campogalliano. At the end of the event, model Meghi Patozi was elected the first Miss Grand Emilia-Romagna. Since 2023, the competition license has belonged to another organizer, Carmelo Tornatore.

Several local auditions were organized annually to determine the finalists for the regional pageant. Besides the main winner, some finalists were also sent to compete nationally in the Miss Grand Italy pageant.

== Editions ==
The following table details Miss Grand Emilia-Romagna's annual editions since 2021.

Edition	Date	Final venue	Entrants	Winner	Ref.
1st	17 September 2021	Ristorante Albergo Da Ca' Vecia, Spilamberto (MO)	11	Meghi Patozi	
2nd	4 September 2022	La Corte 3.0 Restaurant, Rubiera (RE)	11	Greta Gamberini	
3rd	3 June 2023	Bikini Disco Dinner Club, Cattolica (RN)	N/A	None (Note: Three candidates were elected to compete as Emilia-Romagna representatives in the Miss Grand Italy 2023 pageant; no actual Miss Grand Emilia-Romagna 2023 was named.)	
4th	28 July 2024	Parco Terme Panighina, Bertinoro (FC)	14	Nour El Idrissi	

== National competition ==
The following is a list of representatives of the region of Emilia-Romagna in the Miss Grand Italy national pageant.

Year	Representative	Original state title	Placement at Miss Grand Italy	Ref.
2021	Meghi Patozi	Miss Grand Emilia-Romagna 2021	No data available	
2022	Greta Gamberini	Miss Grand Emilia-Romagna 2022	No data available	
2022	Sophia Blanca Schettino	1st runner-up Miss Grand Emilia-Romagna 2022	No data available	
2022	Hilary Frattoluso	2nd runner-up Miss Grand Emilia-Romagna 2022	No data available	
2022	Carol Malagoli	Miss Grand Emilia-Romagna 2022 finalist	No data available	
2023	Viola Missiroli	Winners of the 2023 Emilia-Romagna preliminary stage	No data available	
2023	Vittoria Alvino	Winners of the 2023 Emilia-Romagna preliminary stage	No data available	
2023	Loretta Graziani	2023 Emilia-Romagna preliminary stage – Popular Vote	No data available	
2024	Nour El Idrissi	Miss Grand Emilia-Romagna 2024	Top 20	
2024	Virginia Rocchi	Runners-up Miss Grand Emilia-Romagna 2024	Top 10	
2024	Giulia Berretti	Runners-up Miss Grand Emilia-Romagna 2024	Withdrew	
2024	Lucia Rombol	Runners-up Miss Grand Emilia-Romagna 2024	Unplaced	
