= Miss Grand Trentino-South Tyrol =

Italian regional beauty pageant

- Formation: 3 September 2022; 4 years ago
- Founder: Giulio Romi
- Type: Beauty pageant
- Headquarters: Trentino-South Tyrol
- Location: Italy
- Members: Miss Grand Italy
- Official language: Italian
- Director: Enzo Lamberto (2019); Giulio Romi (2022–2023); Domenico Poggiana (2024)

Miss Grand Trentino-South Tyrol (Italian: Miss Grand Trentino-Alto Adige) is an Italian regional female beauty pageant, founded in 2022 by Giulio Romi. The winners of the contest represent the region of Trentino-South Tyrol in the Miss Grand Italy, a national preliminary pageant for Miss Grand International.

Since the inception of the Miss Grand Italy pageant, Trentino-South Tyrol candidates have never won the title yet; however, the placements they obtained in the national contest remain unclarified due to a lack of national competition results publicized by both regional and national organizers.

== History ==
After Miss Grand Italy's director, Giuseppe Puzio, began franchising the regional competitions to local organizers in 2019, the license for the Trentino-South Tyrol region was granted to a local organizer, Enzo Lamberto, and a model Vanessa Cappellari was named the region's representative for that year's national contest. Later in 2022, the license was then taken over by another organizer, Giulio Romi, who organized the first contest of Miss Grand Trentino-South Tyrol parallelly with the Miss Grand Veneto pageant in Sommacampagna, and three candidates were then elected as Trentino-South Tyrol representatives to the Miss Grand Italy 2022 pageant. Giulio lost the license to Domenico Poggiana in 2024.

== Editions ==
The following table details Miss Grand Trentino-South Tyrol's annual editions since 2022.

Edition	Date	Final venue	Entrants	Winner	Ref.
1st (Note: Held parallelly with the Miss Grand Veneto pageant.)	3 September 2022	Picoverde Water Park, Sommacampagna (VR)	N/A	None (Note: Three candidates were elected to represent the region in the national contest; no actual Miss Grand Trentino-South Tyrol 2022 was crowned.)	
2nd (Note: Held parallelly with the Miss Grand Veneto 2023 and Miss Grand Friuli-Venezia Giulia 2023 pageants.)	28 May 2023	Hotel Villa Pigalle, Belvedere (VI)	No data available		

== National competition ==
The following is a list of representatives of the region of Trentino-South Tyrol in the Miss Grand Italy national pageant.

Year	Representative	Original regional title	Placement at Miss Grand Italy	Ref.
2019	Vanessa Cappellari	Miss Grand Trentino-South Tyrol 2019	No data available	
2022	Andrea Parisi	Winners of the 2022 Miss Grand Veneto and Trentino-South Tyrol qualification stage	No data available	
2022	Gioia Temporin	Winners of the 2022 Miss Grand Veneto and Trentino-South Tyrol qualification stage	No data available	
2022	Alessandra D'este	Winners of the 2022 Miss Grand Veneto and Trentino-South Tyrol qualification stage	No data available	
2023	Anna Toniutti	Winners of the 2023 Miss Grand Veneto and Trentino-South Tyrol qualification stage	No data available	
2023	Arianna Musobelliu	Winners of the 2023 Miss Grand Veneto and Trentino-South Tyrol qualification stage	No data available	
2023	Eleonora Perusin	Winners of the 2023 Miss Grand Veneto and Trentino-South Tyrol qualification stage	No data available	
2023	Serena Forzutti	Winners of the 2023 Miss Grand Veneto and Trentino-South Tyrol qualification stage	No data available	
2023	Stefania Carausu	Winners of the 2023 Miss Grand Veneto and Trentino-South Tyrol qualification stage	No data available	
2023	Valentina Fabbri	Winners of the 2023 Miss Grand Veneto and Trentino-South Tyrol qualification stage	No data available	
2024	Emma Paolino	Appointed	Top 10	
