= Miss Grand Abruzzo =

- Formation: 4 September 2022; 4 years ago
- Founder: Marcello Venditti
- Type: Beauty pageant
- Headquarters: Avezzano
- Location: Italy
- Members: Miss Grand Italy
- Official language: Italian
- Director: Marcelli Venditti (2021–present)

Miss Grand Abruzzo is an Italian regional female beauty pageant, founded in 2022 by a Avezzano-based modeling agency, Mega Star Agency, chaired by Marcelli Venditti. The winners of the contest represent the region of Abruzzo in the Miss Grand Italy national pageant.

Since the first participation in the Miss Grand Italy pageant, Abruzzo representatives have never won the contest yet. The highest placement reached by them was the first runner-up, won by Maria Carmen Crescenzi in 2022. Other placements they obtained remain unclarified due to a lack of summarized national competition results publicized by both regional and national organizers.

== History ==
After Mega Star Model Agency with Marcelli Venditti as the chairperson obtained the Miss Grand Italy license for the Abruzzo region in 2021, the first Miss Grand Abruzzo pageant was subsequently organized in the following year on 4 September, which a model from Penne, Maria Carmen Crescenzi, was named the winner. Maria represented Abruzzo in the Miss Grand Italy 2022 pageant, where she was named the first runner-up.

Several local contests and auditions have been organized annually since 2022 to determine the finalists for the regional pageant of Miss Grand Abruzzo.

== Editions ==
The following table details Miss Grand Abruzzo's annual editions since 2022.

| Edition | Date | Final venue | Entrants | Winner | Ref. |
|---|---|---|---|---|---|
| 1st | 4 September 2022 | Piazza Risorgimento, Avezzano (AQ) | 15 | Maria Carmen Crescenzi | |
| 2nd | 3 December 2022 | Castello Orsini-Odescalchi, Avezzano (AQ) | N/A | Adele Mariani | |

== National competition ==
The following is a list of representatives of the region of Abruzzo in the Miss Grand Italy national pageant.

| Year | Representative | Original state title | Placement at Miss Grand Italy | Ref. |
|---|---|---|---|---|
| 2021 | Alessandra De Luca | No data available | | |
| 2022 | Maria Carmen Crescenzi | Miss Grand Abruzzo 2022 | 1st runner-up | |
| 2023 | Adele Mariani | Miss Grand Abruzzo 2023 | No data available | |
| 2024 | Marcello Venditti | Appointed | Top 20 | |
