= Miss Grand Umbria =

Italian regional beauty pageant

- Formation: 29 August 2019; 6 years ago
- Founder: Lorena Sensini; Massimiliano Marchionni
- Type: Beauty pageant
- Headquarters: Foligno
- Location: Italy
- Official language: Italian
- Director(s): Lorena Sensini & M. Marchionni (2019); Manuel Pauselli (2021–2023)
- Affiliations: Miss Grand Italy

Miss Grand Umbria is an Italian regional female beauty pageant, founded in 2019 by a Foligno-based event organizer, Asy SAS, led by Lorena Sensini and Massimiliano Marchionni. The winners of the contest represent the region of Umbria in the Miss Grand Italy national pageant.

The region of Umbria has not yet won the Miss Grand Italy title. The highest placement reached by its representatives was the top 5 finalists, won in 2019 by Gina Pintea.

== History ==
After the national organizer of Miss Grand Italy began franchising the region competition to the local organizers in 2019, the Umbrain license was taken by Asy SAS, an event organizer in Foligno led by Lorena Sensini and Massimiliano Marchionni. Several auditions were organized throughout the region to determine the finalists for the region pageant, which happened on 29 August 2019, in Ponte Felcino. Gina Pintea was announced as the winner.

The competition license was transferred to another organizer, Manuel Events with the directorship of Manuel Pauselli, who owned and organized the contest annually since 2021. In 2022, the contest was held parallel as an inter-regional event with the Miss Grand Tuscany pageant.

In addition to the main winner, some runners-up were also sent to compete in the national pageant.

== Editions ==
The following table details Miss Grand Umbria's annual editions since 2019.

Edition	Date	Final venue	Entrants	Winner	Ref.
1st	29 August 2019	Piscina Giardini Thebris Sport Complex, Ponte Felcino (PG)		Gina Pintea	
2nd	3 September 2020	Mc Marin's Ai Thebris Restaurant, Ponte Felcino (PG)			
2nd	5 September 2020	The Circle Social Club, Perugia (PG)			
3rd	5 September 2021	The Circle Social Club, Perugia (PG)		Marina Pierotti	
4th	28 July 2022	Piazza Garibaldi, SM. Degli Angeli (PG)	N/A	Sofia Monetti	
5th	5 June 2023	Ristoranti Da Faliero, Montebuono (PG)	N/A	Jasmine Seckruf (Note: Four candidates were chosen to compete at the national pageant.)	
6th	26 July 2024	Scuderia dell’Antica Torre, Ponte Pattoli (PG)	15	Giada Preziuso	

== National competition ==
The following is a list of representatives of the region of Umbria in the Miss Grand Italy national pageant.

Year	Representative(s)	Original regional title	Placement at Miss Grand Italy	Ref.
2019	Gina Pintea	Miss Grand Umbria 2019	Top 5	
2021	Marina Pierotti	Miss Grand Umbria 2021		
2021	Sofia Massarelli	Runners-up Miss Grand Umbria 2021		
2021	Asya Senesi	Runners-up Miss Grand Umbria 2021		
2022	Sofia Monetti	Miss Grand Umbria 2022	No data available	
2023	Jasmine Seckruf	Miss Grand Umbria 2023	No data available	
2023	Francesca Crulli	Runners-up Miss Grand Umbria 2023	No data available	
2023	Sharon Chukwurah	Runners-up Miss Grand Umbria 2023	No data available	
2024	Giada Preziuso	Miss Grand Umbria 2024	Withdrew	
2024	Arianna Pizzoni	Runners-up Miss Grand Umbria 2024	Withdrew	
2024	Giulia Propersi	Runners-up Miss Grand Umbria 2024	Top 20	
