= Miss Grand Calabria =

- Formation: 3 September 2019; 7 years ago
- Type: Beauty pageant
- Headquarters: Corigliano-Rossano
- Location: Cosenza, Italy
- Members: Miss Grand Italy
- Official language: Italian
- Director: Enzo Lamberto (2019–2020); Massimo Spano (2021); Mimmo Luzzi (2022–2023); Giuseppe Caggegi (2024)

Miss Grand Calabria is an Italian regional female beauty pageant, founded in 2019 by the director of Pubblistar 2000, Enzo Lamberto. The winners of the contest represent the region of Calabria in the Miss Grand Italy national pageant.

Since the foundation of the Miss Grand Italy pageant, Calabria candidates have never won the main title yet, and the placements they obtained remain unclarified due to a lack of summarized national competition results publicized by both regional and national organizers.

== History ==
After the Miss Grand Italy director, Giuseppe Puzio, began franchising the competition licenses to local organizers in 2019, the franchise of Calabria was then purchased by a modeling agency named Pubblistar 2000, chaired by Enzo Lamberto, who organized the first Miss Grand Calabria pageant on 3 September 2019, at the Lungomare Hotel, Reggio Calabria. Later in 2021, Lamberto lost the license to a fashion consultant Massimo Spano of Focalizza Agency.

From 2022 to 2023, the competition license belonged to Mimmo Luzzi, who is also the organizer of another regional pageant named Miss Corigliano-Rossano. It was then taken over by Giuseppe Caggegi in 2024.

Several local auditions and contests were organized annually to determine the finalists for the Miss Grand Calabria pageant.

== Editions ==
The following table details Miss Grand Calabria's annual editions since 2019.

Edition	Date	Final venue	Entrants	Winner	Ref.
1st	3 September 2019	Lungomare Hotel, Reggio Calabria (RC)	No data available		
2nd	22 August 2021	Baywatch Stabilimento Balneare, Caulonia (RC)	N/A	None (Note: Three candidates were elected to compete at the Miss Grand Italy 2021 pageant; no actual Miss Grand Calabria 2021 was crowned.)	
3rd	23 August 2022	Lido Tropix Restaurant, Corigliano-Rossano, (CS)	N/A	Denisa Christina Orzoi	
4th	2 June 2023	Village Camping Due Elle, Corigliano-Rossano, (CS)	No data available		

== National competition ==
The following is a list of representatives of the region of Calabria in the Miss Grand Italy national pageant.

Year	Representative	Original regional title	Placement at Miss Grand Italy	Ref.
2019	No data available (Note: Several local pageants was held to determine the candidates for the region-level pageant but no further details regarding the regional final competition.)			
2021	Francesca Carnovale	Winners of the 2021 Calabrian qualification stage	No data available	
2021	Chiara Brogneri	Winners of the 2021 Calabrian qualification stage	No data available	
2021	Natalia Lazzaro	Winners of the 2021 Calabrian qualification stage	No data available	
2022	Denisa Christina Orzoi	Miss Grand Calabria 2022	No data available	
2023	No data available			
2024	Gaia Travaglianti	Appointed	Unplaced	
