= Miss Grand Sicily =

Italian regional beauty pageant

- Formation: 29 August 2019; 7 years ago
- Founder: Gianni Saija
- Type: Beauty pageant
- Headquarters: Sicily
- Location: Italy
- Members: Miss Grand Italy
- Official language: Italian
- Director: Gianni Saija (2019); Massimo Pantano (2020–2022); Giuseppe Caggegi (2023–2024)

Miss Grand Sicily is an Italian regional female beauty pageant, founded in 2019 by an Augusta-based event organizer, Gianni Saija. The winners of the contest represent the region of Sicily in the Miss Grand Italy, a national preliminary pageant for Miss Grand International.

Since the inception of the Miss Grand Italy pageant, Sicily candidates have never won the contest yet. The highest placement they obtained was the top 10 finalist won in 2020 by a regional finalist, Camilla Checchi; however, other placements they reached remain unclarified due to a lack of national competition results publicized by both regional and national organizers.

== History ==
After Miss Grand Italy's director, Giuseppe Puzio, began franchising the regional competitions to local organizers in 2019, the license for the Sicily region was granted to a local organizer, Gianni Saija. Several local pageants were then organized to select the finalists for the region-level contest, which later happened on 29 August 2019, at the Piazza delle Grazie in Augusta, and a model Maria Giorgia Accolla was named the winner. From 2020 to 2022, the competition license was taken over by Massimo Pantano, who is the chairperson of Massimo Pantano Model Agency, and was then transferred to Giuseppe Caggegi in 2023.

Besides the main winner, some runners-up were also sent to compare in the national pageant.

== Editions ==
The following table details Miss Grand Sicily's annual editions since 2019.

| Edition | Date | Final venue | Winner | Ref. |
|---|---|---|---|---|
| 1st | 29 August 2019 | Piazza delle Grazie, Augusta (SR) | Maria Giorgia Accolla | |
| 2nd | 12 August 2020 | Colonia don Bosco, Catania (CT) | Samantha Chiarenza | |
| 3rd | 12 September 2021 | Romano Palace Luxury Hotel, Viale Kennedy (CT) | Francesca Bertolini | |
| 4th | 10 September 2022 | Qubba Night Club, Misterbianco (CT) | Alessia Stissi | |
| 5th | 3 June 2023 | Jaaneta Beach Disco Club, Lungomare Schisò, Giardini Naxos (ME) | Lidia Castorina | |
| 6th | 16 August 2024 | Villa Aldo Moro, Cesarò (ME) | Miriana Nunnari | |
| 7th | 27 August 2025 | Piazza della Madonna della Catena, Castiglione di Sicilia | Rebecca D’Agostino | |

== National competition ==
The following is a list of representatives of the region of Sicily in the Miss Grand Italy national pageant.

| Year | Representative | Original state title | Placement at Miss Grand Italy | Ref. |
|---|---|---|---|---|
| 2019 | Maria Giorgia Accolla | Miss Grand Sicily 2019 | No data available | |
| 2020 | Samantha Chiarenza | Miss Grand Sicily 2020 | No data available | |
| 2021 | Francesca Bertolini | Miss Grand Sicily 2021 | No data available | |
| 2022 | Alessia Stissi | Miss Grand Sicily 2022 | No data available | |
| 2023 | Lidia Castorina | Miss Grand Sicily 2023 | No data available | |
| 2024 | Miriana Nunnari | Miss Grand Sicily 2024 | Top 10 | |
