= Miss Grand Friuli-Venezia Giulia =

Italian regional beauty pageant

- Formation: 24 July 2021; 5 years ago
- Founder: Emily Miozzo
- Headquarters: Friuli-Venezia Giulia
- Location: Italy
- Members: Miss Grand Italy
- Official language: Italian
- Director: Emily Miozzo (2021–2022); Dominic Pogiana (2023); Mattia Baici (2024)

Miss Grand Friuli-Venezia Giulia is an Italian regional female beauty pageant, founded in 2021 by Emily Miozzo. The winners of the contest represent the region of Friuli-Venezia Giulia in the Miss Grand Italy national pageant.

Since the inception of the Miss Grand Italy pageant, Friuli-Venezia Giulia candidates have never won the contest yet; however, placements they obtained at the national level remain unclarified due to a lack of national competition results publicized by both regional and national organizers.

== History ==
The Miss Grand Friuli-Venezia Giulia pageant was organized for the first time in 2021, with a television personality, Emily Miozzo, as the regional coordinator. In 2023, the competition license was taken over by Dominic Pogiana, who also served as the regional coordinator for the regional of Veneto and Trentino-Alto Adige/Südtirol in that year. It was then transferred to Mattia Baici the following year.

Several local pageants and auditions were organized to determine the finalists for the Miss Grand Friuli-Venezia Giulia pageant. For example, in 2024, the local preliminary events happened two times in Remanzacco, and once in Mortegliano.

== Editions ==
The following table details Miss Grand Friuli-Venezia Giulia's annual editions since 2021.

Edition	Date	Final venue	Entrants	Winner	Ref.
1st	24 July 2021	Presso Yachting Club, Aprilia Marittima, Latisana (UD)	N/A	Giulia Pontoni	
2nd	2 September 2022	Tavagnacco City Park, Tavagnacco (UD)	N/A	Giorgia De Marchi	
3rd (Note: Held parallelly with the Miss Grand Trentino-South Tyrol 2023 and Miss Grand Veneto 2023 pageants.)	28 May 2023	Hotel Villa Pigalle, Belvedere (VI)	N/A	Emma Paolino	
4th	14 July 2024	Villa Mabulton 2.0 Hotel, Chiasiellis (UD)	13	Evi Graziano	

== National competition ==
The following is a list of representatives of the region of Friuli-Venezia Giulia in the Miss Grand Italy national pageant.

Year	Representative	Original state title	Placement at Miss Grand Italy	Ref.
2021	Giulia Pontoni	Miss Grand Friuli-Venezia Giulia 2021	No data available	
2022	Giorgia De Marchi	Miss Grand Friuli-Venezia Giulia 2022	No data available	
2023	Emma Paolino	Miss Grand Friuli-Venezia Giulia 2023	No data available	
2024	Evi Graziano	Miss Grand Friuli-Venezia Giulia 2024	Unplaced	
