= Canale Italia =

Italian broadcasting company

Canale Italia S.r.l.
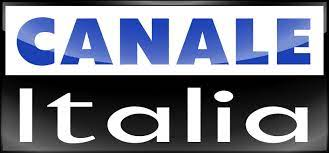
- Industry: Television
- Founded: 2004
- Founder: Lucio Garbo
- Headquarters: Veneto, Italy
- Area served: Italy

Canale Italia S.r.l. is a Veneto-based Italian broadcasting company.

== History ==
After more than 20 years broadcasting in the Northeast Italy under the name Serenissima TV, in 2004 it acquired UHF channels from France 2 relay Telecentrotoscana that allowed the station to be seen in the whole northern Italy. After acquiring other channels to cover Rome, Serenissima TV became Canale Italia.

Canale Italia then expanded in the following years, being broadcast in syndication in some regions and acquiring new channels in others. On November 4, 2009, Canale Italia acquired all the channels of Perugia based station RTE 24H that covered Umbria and Tuscany alongside portions of Lazio and Marche.

In 2011/2012, Canale Italia signed a deal to distribute France 24's in Italy through its channel 141. In 2015, Canale Italia acquired Tivuitalia.

In March 2023, Canale Italia was fined for broadcasting ads of erotic hotlines, which is absolutely forbidden for all one- and two-digit channels in Italia.

== Channels ==
National networks within the Canale Italia group are:

- Canale Italia 83 - It is the generalist flagship network with a programming consisting of information, cinema, sport and talk shows. It also broadcasts shopping, lottery and cartomancy programs.
- Canale Italia 84 - Generalist network that includes information, musical entertainment and talk shows. It also broadcasts shopping, lottery and cartomancy programs.
- Italia 121 - Broadcasts shopping programs.
- Arte Italia 124 - Network dedicated to art.
- Arte Italia 125 - Network dedicated to art.
- Italia 126 - Broadcasts teleshopping.
- Italia 127 - Broadcasts teleshopping.
- Italia 135 - Broadcasts teleshopping.
- Italia 136 - Broadcasts teleshopping.
- Italia 141 - Broadcasts teleshopping - attributed to France 24 since 2011/2012
- Italia 142 - Broadcasts teleshopping.
- Italia 150 - Broadcasts teleshopping.
- Italia 154 - Broadcasts teleshopping.
- Italia 155 - Broadcasts teleshopping.
- Italia 159 - Broadcasts the local channel Video Piacenza.
- Italia 160 - Broadcasts teleshopping.
- Canale Italia 164 - Broadcasts teleshopping.
- Canale Italia 161 - Broadcasts teleshopping.
- Canale Italia 5 - Broadcasts teleshopping.
- Canale Italia 6 - Broadcasts teleshopping.
- Canale Italia 11 - Broadcasts teleshopping.
- Canale Italia 2 - Broadcasts teleshopping.
- Canale Italia 4 - Broadcasts teleshopping.
- Serenissima Televisione - historically the first TV network born in the North East in 1979, of generalist nature. It now broadcasts shopping programs.

The group also owns Radio Canale Italia, a web radio broadcast through digital terrestrial on channels 724 and 780.
