= Miss Grand Apulia =

Miss Grand Apulia Miss Grand Puglia
- Formation: 21 August 2021; 5 years ago
- Founder: Giuseppe Romanelli
- Type: Beauty pageant
- Headquarters: Martina Franca
- Location: Taranto, Italy
- Members: Miss Grand Italy
- Official language: Italian
- Director: Giuseppe Romanelli (2021–present)

Miss Grand Apulia (Italian: Miss Grand Puglia) is an Italian regional female beauty pageant, founded in 2021 by a Martina Franca-based entrepreneur, Giuseppe Romanelli. The winners of the contest represent the region of Apulia in the Miss Grand Italy national pageant.

Since their first participation in the Miss Grand Italy pageant, Apulia representatives won the contest once in 2022 by Miriam Malerba, who then competed internationally in the international tournament in Indonesia, but was unplaced. Other placements they obtained remain unclarified due to a lack of summarized national competition results publicized by both regional and national organizers.

== History ==
After Miss Grand Italy began franchising the regional license to local organizers, the Apulia franchise was awarded to entrepreneur Giuseppe Romanelli of Martina Franca, who has been serving as the director of Miss Grand Apulia since 2021. Under his directorship, the first contest of Miss Grand Apulia happened on 21 August 2021, at the Club L'egizio Restaurant in Martina Franca, in which four candidates were elected as the region representatives to the Miss Grand Italy 2021 pageant. The contest has been held annually since then.

Besides the regional winner, some runners-up were also sent to compete in the national contest. Several local auditions and contests were organized annually to elect the finalists for the region-level pageant.

== Editions ==
The following table details Miss Grand Apulia's annual editions since 2021.

| Edition | Date | Final venue | Entrants | Winner | Ref. |
|---|---|---|---|---|---|
| 1st | 21 August 2021 | Club L'egizio Restaurant, Martina Franca (TA) | N/A | None (Note: Three candidates were elected to compete at the Miss Grand Italy 2021 pageant; no actual Miss Grand Apulia 2021 was crowned.) | |
| 2nd | 25 August 2022 | Villa dei Sogni, Martina Franca (TA) | 15 | Miriam Malerba | |
| 3rd | 10 December 2022 | Hotel Villa Rosa, Martina Franca (TA) | N/A | Marika Giannattasio | |
| 4th | 23 June 2024 | Hotel Cecere, San Basilio (TA) | N/A | Veronica Corrente | |
| 5th (Note: As an inter-regional pageant of Miss Grand Apulia and Miss Grand Molise 2025.) | 29 June 2025 | Villa dei Sogni, Martina Franca (TA) | 50 | Asia Tommasi | |

== National competition ==
The following is a list of representatives of the region of Apulia in the Miss Grand Italy national pageant.

| Year | Representative | Original state title | Placement at Miss Grand Italy | Ref. |
|---|---|---|---|---|
| 2021 | Anna Nocera | Winners of the 2021 Apulia qualification stage | No data available | |
| 2021 | Swami Di Noia | Winners of the 2021 Apulia qualification stage | No data available | |
| 2021 | Miriam Circelli | Winners of the 2021 Apulia qualification stage | No data available | |
| 2022 | Miriam Malerba | Miss Grand Apulia 2022 | Winner | |
| 2023 | Marika Giannattasio | Miss Grand Apulia 2023 | No data available | |
| 2024 | Veronica Corrente | Miss Grand Apulia 2024 | 1st runner-up | |
| 2025 | Asia Tommasi | Miss Grand Apulia 2025 | | |
