= Miss Grand Lazio =

Italian regional beauty pageant

- Formation: August 31, 2019; 7 years ago
- Founder: Romano Storace
- Type: Beauty pageant
- Headquarters: Lazio
- Location: Italy
- Members: Miss Grand Italy
- Official language: Italian
- Director: Romano Storace (2019–2023); Alessandra Fattoruso (2024)

Miss Grand Lazio is an Italian regional female beauty pageant, founded in 2019 by a Colleferro-based event organizer, Romano Storace. The winners of the contest the Miss Grand Italy national pageant.

Since the inception of the Miss Grand Italy pageant, Lazio candidates won the contest once in 2021 by Marika Nardozi, followed by the 2nd runner-up, won in 2022 by Sofia Moscatelli. Other placements they reached remain unclarified due to a lack of national competition results publicized by both regional and national organizers.

== History ==
After Miss Grand Italy's director, Giuseppe Puzio, began franchising the regional competitions to local organizers in 2019, the license for the Lazio region was granted to a local organizer, Romano Storace, who is also the chairperson of an Colleferro-based modeling agency named RS Model Junior. Romano organized the first edition of Miss Grand Lazio on 31 August 2019, at the Piazza Marcantonio Colonna in Paliano. In 2022, the pageant was held parallelly with the Miss Grand Liguria pageant due to a lack of Ligurian region coordinator. The contract between Romano Storace and Miss Grand Italy organizer was terminated in 2024 when the regional license was taken over by Alessandra Fattoruso.

Several local auditions and pageants were organized annually regionwide to elect the final candidates for the Miss Grand Lazio pageant, such as in Montelanico and Colleferro.

== Editions ==
The following table details Miss Grand Lazio's annual editions since 2019.

Edition	Date	Final venue	Entrants	Winner	Ref.
1st	31 August 2019	Piazza Marcantonio Colonna, Paliano (FR)	No data available		
2nd	10 September 2020	Auditorium Fabbrica della Musica, Colleferro Scalo (RM)	No data available		
3rd	23 September 2021	Piazza Italia, Colleferro (RM)	No data available		
4th (Note: Held parallelly with the Miss Grand Liguria pageant.)	8 September 2022	Corso Turati, Colleferro (RM)	No data available		
5th	No data available (Note: Local pageants were organized to select the finalists for the Miss Grand Lazio 2023 pageant; however, no information regarding the region-level contest.)			Veronica Corrente	
6th	26 July 2024	Piazza Roberto Rossellini, Ladispoli (RM)	8	Morgana Nuccio	

== National competition ==
The following is a list of representatives of the region of Lazio in the Miss Grand Italy national pageant.

Year	Representative	Original state title	Placement at Miss Grand Italy	Ref.
No data available for the 2019–2020 representatives
2021	Marika Nardozi	No data available	Winner	
2022	Sofia Moscatelli	No data available	2nd runner-up	
2022	Fabiana Paris	No data available	No data available	
2022	Giorgia Legrottaglie	No data available	No data available	
2023	Veronica Corrente	Miss Grand Lazio 2023	No data available	
2024	Morgana Nuccio	Miss Grand Lazio 2024	Top 20	
