= Miss Grand Liguria =

Italian regional beauty pageant

- Formation: 8 September 2022; 4 years ago
- Founder: Romano Storace
- Type: Beauty pageant
- Headquarters: Liguria
- Location: Italy
- Members: Miss Grand Italy
- Official language: Italian
- Director: Romano Storace (2022); Monica Jordan (2023–2024)

Miss Grand Liguria is an Italian regional female beauty pageant, founded in 2022 by a Colleferro-based organizer, Romano Storace. The winners of the contest represent the region of Liguria in the Miss Grand Italy national pageant.

Since the inception of the Miss Grand Italy pageant, Liguria candidates have never won the contest yet; the placements they obtained in the national round remain unclarified due to a lack of national competition results publicized by both regional and national organizers.

== History ==
In 2022, after Miss Grand Italy's director, Giuseppe Puzio, began franchising the regional competitions to local organizers, the license for the Lazio region was granted to a Colleferro-based entrepreneur, Romano Storace, who also served as that year's director of the Miss Grand Lazio pageant. Under the directorship of Romano, the first Miss Grand Liguria competition was held parallelly with the Miss Grand Lazio 2022 pageant in Colleferro, where a model Melissa Yucel was named Miss Grand Liguria 2022.

Later in 2023, the license of Miss Grand Liguria was then transferred to another organizer, Monica Jordan, and the competition was then moved to Genoa.

== Editions ==
The following table details Miss Grand Liguria's annual editions since 2022.

Edition	Date	Final venue	Entrants	Winner	Ref.
1st (Note: Held parallelly with the Miss Grand Lazio pageant.)	8 September 2022	Piazza Italia, Colleferro (RM)	N/A	Melissa Yucel	
2nd	27 May 2023	Holiday Inn, Genoa (GE)	N/A	No data available	
3rd	28 July 2024	Holiday Inn, Genoa (GE)	9	Liz Garcìa	

== National competition ==
The following is a list of representatives of the region of Liguria in the Miss Grand Italy national pageant.

Year	Representative	Original state title	Placement at Miss Grand Italy	Ref.
2022	Melissa Yucel	Miss Grand Liguria 2022	No data available	
2023	Milena Acosta Yepez	Winners of the 2023 Ligurian qualification stage	No data available	
2023	Aya Blluomu	Winners of the 2023 Ligurian qualification stage	No data available	
2023	Dayanancy Pena	Winners of the 2023 Ligurian qualification stage	No data available	
2024	Liz Garcìa	Miss Grand Liguria 2024	Top 20	
