= Miss Grand Marche =

Italian regional beauty pageant

- Formation: 17 September 2021; 5 years ago
- Founder: Francesca Guidi
- Headquarters: Marche
- Location: Italy
- Members: Miss Grand Italy
- Official language: Italian
- Director: Francesca Guidi (2021–2024)

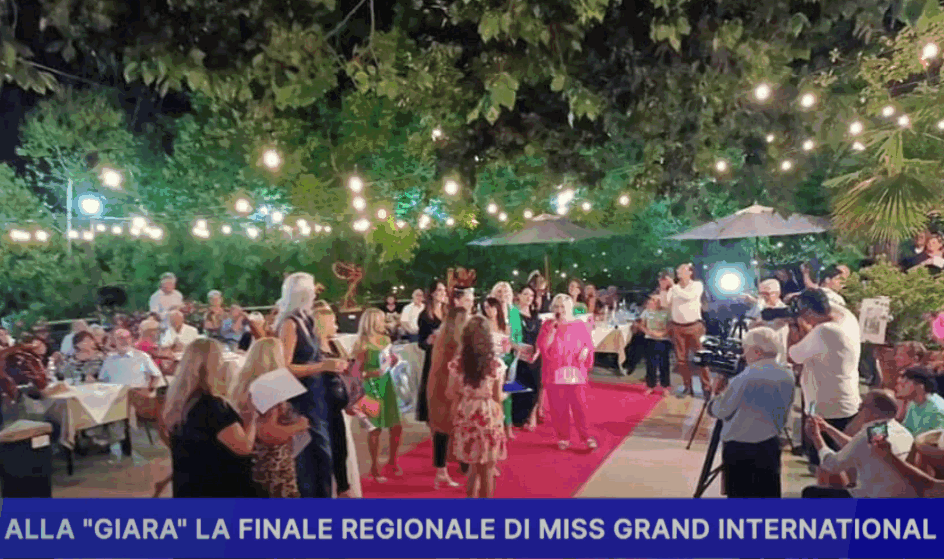
Miss Grand Marche 2023 Grand Gala Finals on June 3, at the La Giara Ristorante Pizzeria, Pesaro.

Miss Grand Marche is an Italian regional female beauty pageant, founded in 2021 by Francesca Guidi. The winners of the contest represent the region of Marche in the Miss Grand Italy, an Italian national preliminary for Miss Grand International.

Since the inception of the Miss Grand Italy pageant, Marche candidates have never won the contest yet; however, the placements they obtained in the national round remain unclarified due to a lack of national competition results publicized by both regional and national organizers.

== History ==
After Miss Grand Italy's director, Giuseppe Puzio, began franchising the regional competitions to local organizers, the license for the Marche region was granted to a Pesaro-based organizer, Francesca Guidi, who has been serving as the Miss Grand Marche's director since 2021. Under the directorship of Francesca, the first contest of Miss Grand Marche happened on 17 September 2021, at the Modà Music Dinner Club in Gradara.

== Editions ==
The following table details Miss Grand Marche's annual editions since 2021.

Edition	Date	Final venue	Entrants	Winner	Ref.
1st	17 September 2021	Modà Music Dinner Club, Gradara (PU)	No data available		
2nd	27 August 2022	La Giara Ristorante Pizzeria, Pesaro (PU)	N/A	Tamara Etchevery	
3rd	3 June 2023	La Giara Ristorante Pizzeria, Pesaro (PU)	N/A	Cecilia Rinaldi	
4th	18 August 2024	La Giara Ristorante Pizzeria, Pesaro (PU)	19	Caterina Baldini	

== National competition ==
The following is a list of representatives of the region of Marche in the Miss Grand Italy national pageant.

Year	Representative	Original state title	Placement at Miss Grand Italy	Ref.
2022	Tamara Mariana Etchevery	Miss Grand Marche 2022	No data available	
2023	Cecilia Rinaldi	Miss Grand Marche 2023	No data available	
2024	Caterina Baldini	Miss Grand Marche 2024	Unplaced	
