= Maratea =

Maratea Marathia (Greek)
- Comune
- Città di Maratea
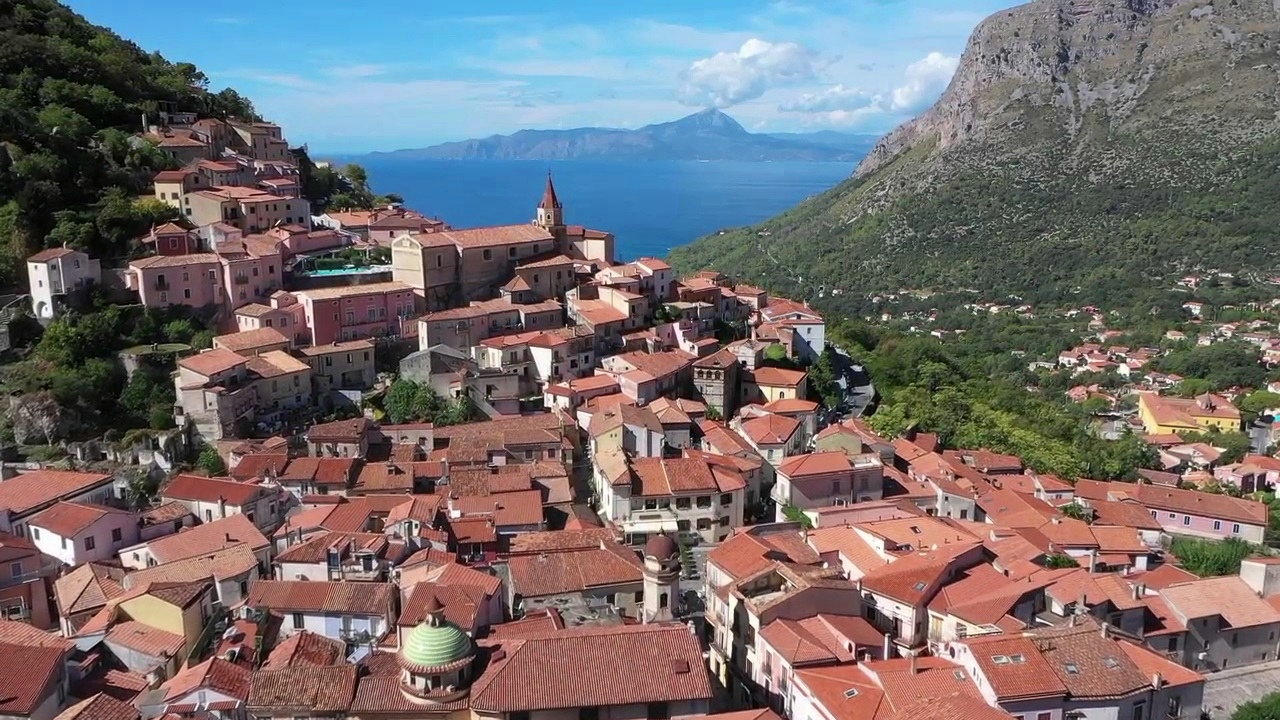
- View of Maratea

- Coat of arms

- Location of Maratea in Italy Maratea (Basilicata)
- Coordinates: 39°59′N 15°43′E
- Country: Italy
- Region: Basilicata
- Province: Potenza (PZ)
- Frazioni: Acquafredda, Brefaro, Castrocucco, Cersuta, Fiumicello, Marina, Massa, Santa Caterina, Porto

Government
  - Mayor: Daniele Stoppelli

Area
  - Total: 67 km^{2} (26 sq mi)
- Elevation: 300 m (980 ft)

Population (31 March 2018)
  - Total: 5,085
  - Density: 76/km^{2} (200/sq mi)
- Demonym: Marateoti
- Time zone: UTC+1 (CET)
  - Summer (DST): UTC+2 (CEST)
- Postal code: 85046
- Dialing code: 0973
- ISTAT code: 076044
- Patron saint: Saint Blaise
- Saint day: second Sunday in May
- Website: Official website

Maratea (IPA: [maraˈtɛːa]; Marateota: Marathia [maraˈtiːə]) is an Italian town and comune of Basilicata, in the province of Potenza. It is the only comune of the region on the Tyrrhenian coast, and is known as "the Pearl of the Tyrrhenian". Owing to the considerable number of its churches and chapels it has also been described as "the town with 44 churches". It is one of I Borghi più belli d'Italia ("The most beautiful villages of Italy").

== Geography ==
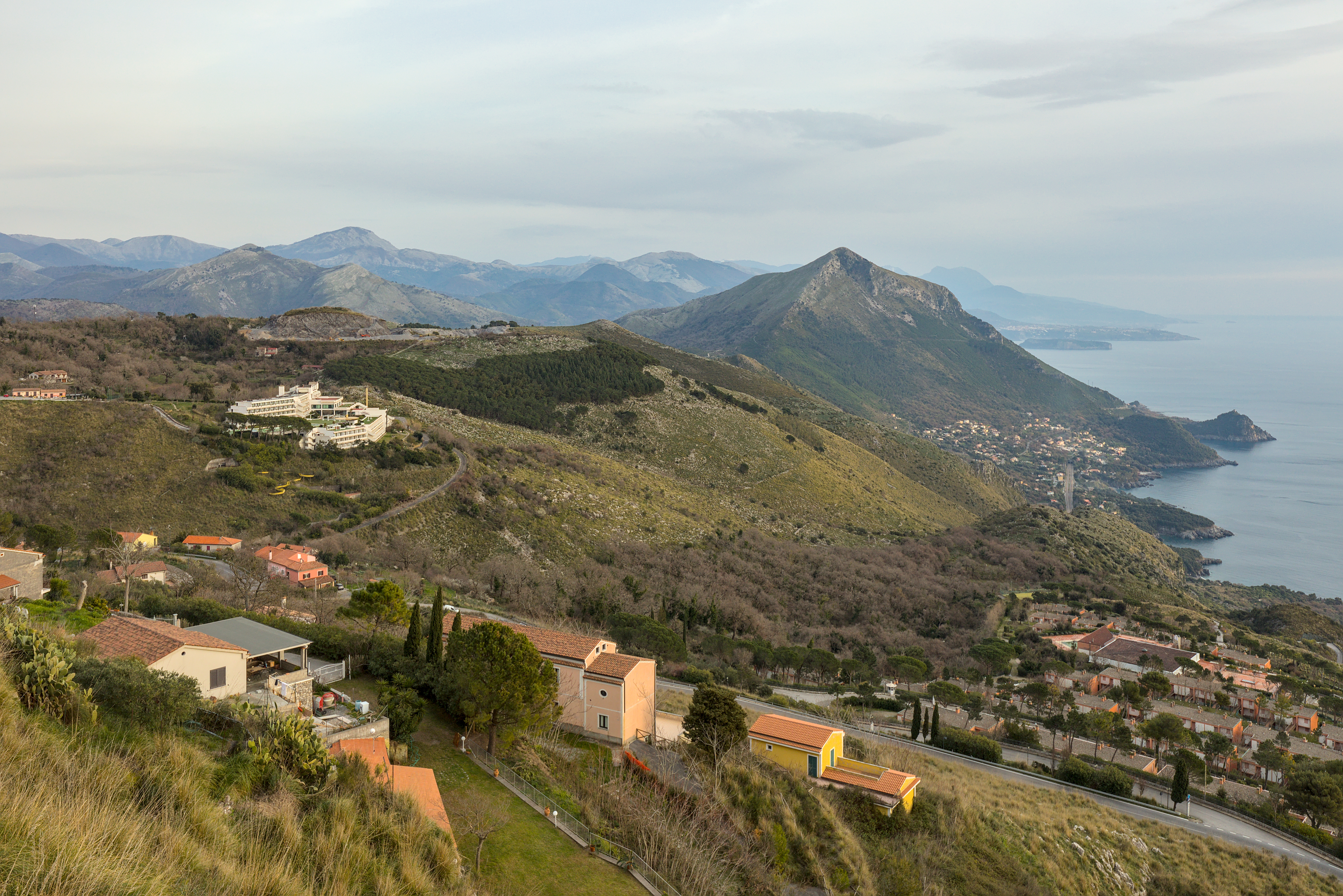
The Pollino mountain range and the Tyrrhenian coast as seen from Maratea.

Maratea is the only town of Basilicata on the Tyrrhenian Sea. It has approximately 32 kilometres (20 miles) of rocky coastline, with more than twenty beaches. One of the main characteristics of Maratea is the variety of its landscapes, varying from breath-taking sea views to wooded hillsides and majestic mountains which sweep down to the sea creating steep cliffs.

The Grotta di Maratea, or the Cave of Wonders, was discovered in 1929 by men building the Highway 18 from Calabria.

The centre of the town (called Maratea Borgo, meaning "Maratea's Old Town") is situated on the northern slopes of Mount San Biagio; other villages in the comune include Acquafredda, Cersuta, Fiumicello, Porto, Marina, Castrocucco (situated on the coast), Castello, Santa Caterina, Massa and Brefaro (situated on the overlooking hills). The principal vegetation comprises oaks, pines, rosemary, holm oaks, carob trees and wild fennel.

Maratea has a small harbour, which can accommodate up to 200 boats.

== Etymology ==
Maratea probably derives from the fennel plant, which is called Marathéa/Μαραθέα in Medieval Greek, Marathía in Italiot Greek (as well as Marathiá/Μαραθιά in Modern Greek).

== History ==
Based on archeological findings, the first settlements in the Maratea region date back to the Paleolithic era. In the 15th–14th century BC a village grew up on top of the little headland called La Timpa. This was a small trading center, and its existence is documented until the 2nd century BC, when the Romans conquered Lucania.

During the Roman era, the region continued to be a trade center: on the seabed near Santo Janni island dozens of ancient anchors have been found, and these are now on display in the local museum.

After the fall of the Western Roman Empire, southern Italy became part of the Byzantine Empire, starting from the Gothic Wars (6th century). From the 7th century, the Tyrrhenian Sea came under the control of the Saracens, (Sicily became a Muslim emirate in the 9th century), who sacked numerous towns. So, for safety reasons, the local inhabitants moved to the high ground of Mount San Biagio, where they built the so-called Castello, a little fortified urban centre.

In 732 a ship, fleeing the religious persecution of Leo III the Isaurian, brought the sacred remains of Saint Blaise to Maratea, who thereafter became the patron saint of the town. The remains of the saint are still kept in the Maratea's Basilica, which is built over an ancient temple of Minerva.

In 1077 Maratea, together with the rest of Southern Italy, was conquered by the Normans.

In the 11th-12th century, since the Castello could no longer accommodate the increasing population, some of the people of Maratea decided to found a new urban centre, historically called the Borgo (a word that means "village" in Italian). Today the ancient Borgo is the principal urban centre of Maratea. In view of the risk from Saracen attacks, the Borgo was situated behind Mount San Biagio, so that it could not be seen from the sea.

In 1282 the War of the Sicilian Vespers began, in which the houses of Angevins and Aragon fought for control of the Kingdom of Naples. The war ended in 1302, but the dispute continued for another century. Between 1302 and 1496, thanks to its loyalty to the royal house, Maratea was awarded numerous grants of autonomy. The Castello was put under siege in 1441, by Lauria (a nearby town), and in 1495 by Angevins soldiers. On both occasion it resisted successfully.

From 1566 to 1595, six guardhouse-towers were built along the coastline, to protect the new villages that had developed in the meantime: Acquafredda, Cersuta and Porto.

On 2 May 1676 the village of the Borgo was besieged by 160 bandits. However, the guards of the Castello killed the bandit leader and captured the remainder of the gang.

In the 18th century Maratea entered a period of progress and prosperity; on April 12, 1734, the first hospital of Basilicata was opened in the town. Many of the so-called 44 churches were built during this period.

When Napoleon Bonaparte proclaimed his brother Joseph King of Naples, Maratea was one of the few cities which did not accept French supremacy. In August 1806 the nearby town of Lauria, whose citizens also refused to acknowledge Napoleon, was set on fire by general André Masséna. Alessandro Mandarini, mayor of Maratea and commander of its castle, believing that Maratea would be the next target, evacuated the inhabitants to Sicily. Since Mandarini had been promised relief from the English army, he remained, with only 1,000 men, to defend the castle and the town. After three days under siege, Mandarini, who did not receive any help by the English, was forced to surrender (December 10, 1806). In token of their great admiration for the brave resistance, the French spared the lives of the rebels, but ordered them to pull down the walls of the castle. The latter was slowly abandoned during the 19th and 20th century.

After the return of the House of Bourbon to the throne of Naples, a movement developed that would have brought about the political unification of the peninsula. In 1848, one of its leaders, the revolutionary Costabile Carducci, was killed after years of being hunted by the Neapolitan militia.

In 1861, Italy was finally united. However, at this time Maratea suffered extreme poverty, in common with the rest of Basilicata. Many of its inhabitants emigrated to the United States or to Venezuela, and with their economic help Maratea was connected to the railway network in 1894, built its first aqueduct in 1902, had electrical connection from 1924, and tarred roads connected the Old Town with the outlying districts on the coast in 1930.

Thanks to the help of Stefano Rivetti, an Italian industrialist, in the 1950s the economic situation of Maratea improved: factories (a wooden-mill and an industrial estate) and many hotels were opened.

== Main sights ==
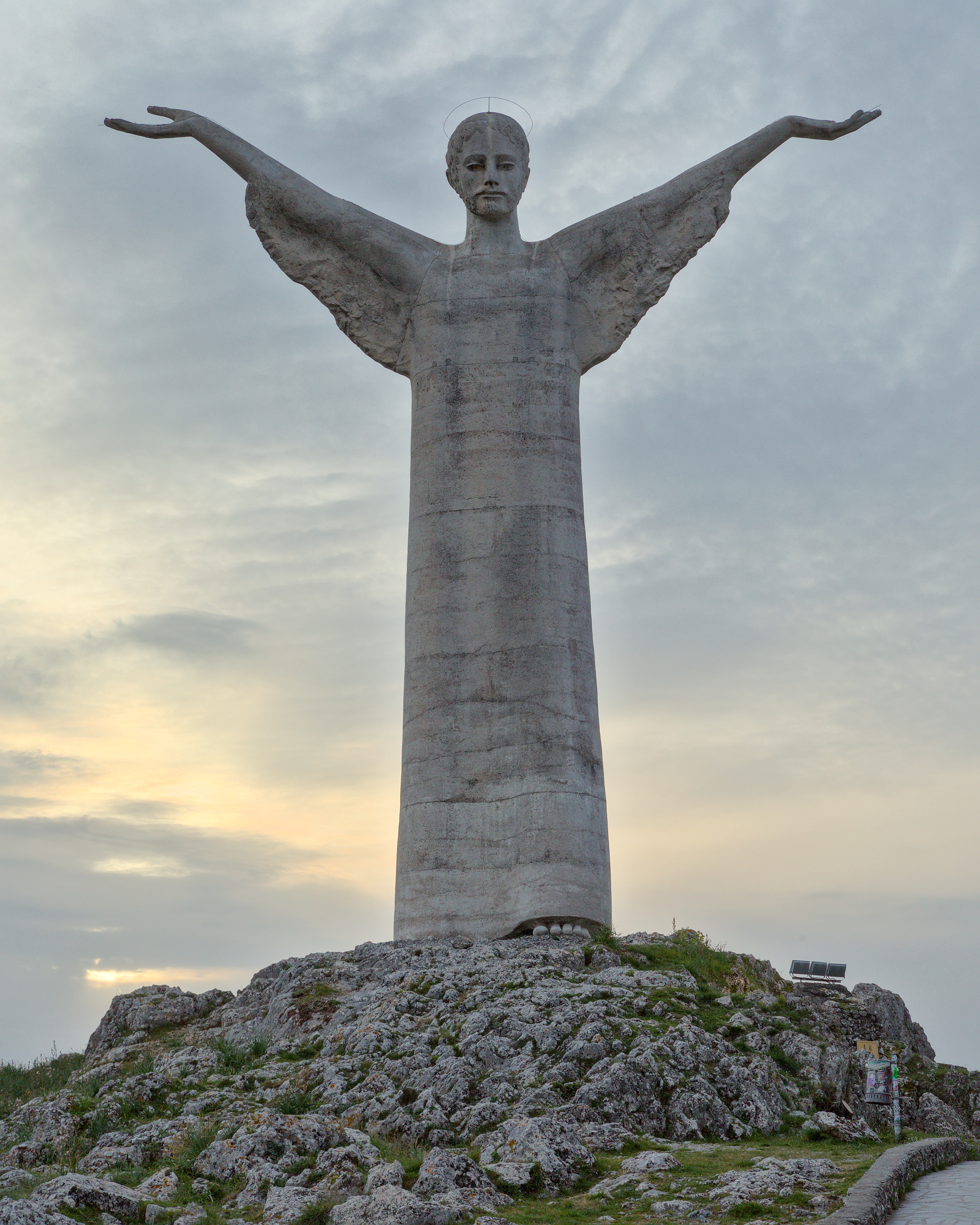
The Statue of Christ at the top of Mount San Biagio

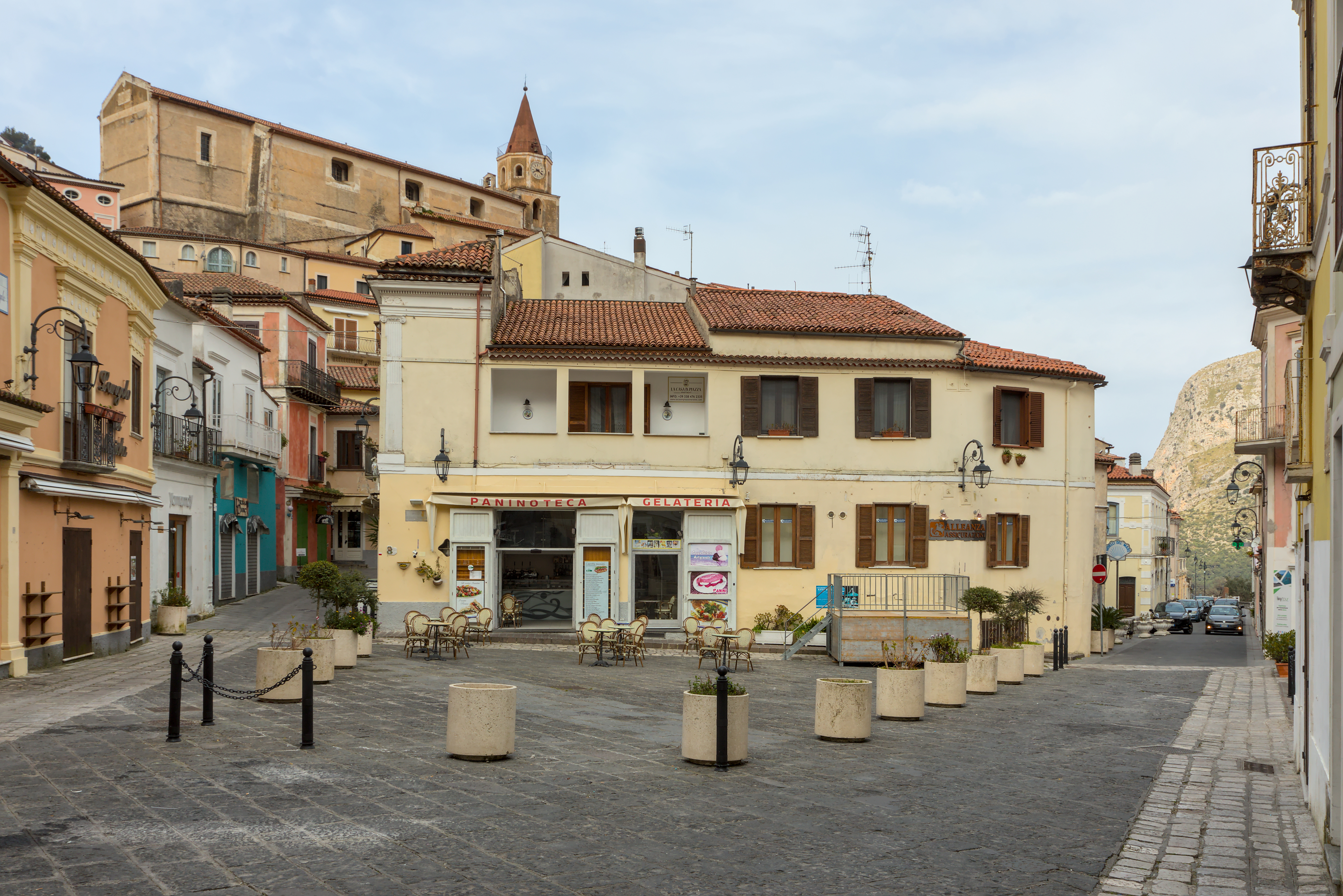
Piazza Buraglia in the Old Town, with the church of Santa Maria Maggiore in the background

=== The Statue of Christ ===
The statue of Christ the Redeemer, or the Christ of Maratea, was built of pure Carrara marble in 1965 by Bruno Innocenti, a sculptor from Florence. It is located on the top of Monte San Biagio, right in front of the basilica.

=== The 44 Churches ===
Maratea is called the town with 44 churches for the number of its churches and chapels.

- Basilica of Saint Blaise. It is the main church in the town, situated at the Castello. Built in the 6th-7th century, it houses the remains of the saint, in honor of which, every year (on the second Sunday of May), a procession takes place in which the silver statue of the saint is transported from the basilica to the main church of the Old Town.
- Church of Santa Maria Maggiore, built in 1505, is the principal church of the Old Town
- Church of Saint Vitus. It is the most ancient church of the Old Town, dating to the 9th century
- Church of the Holy Annunciation, built in the 16th century
- Church of Our Lady of Sorrows, built in 1620
- Church of Mary Immaculate (16th century). In its crypt was found the ancient church of Saint Peter
- Church of the Calvary (15th century)
- Church of Saint Anthony, built in 1615. It is home to a precious wooden polyptych
- Church of Saint Anne (14th century)
- Church of Saint Francis of Paola (17th century)
- Church of the Rosary, constructed in 1575. It is one of the most beautiful edifices of the town.
- Chapel of Mary of Lourdes, built in 1932
- Chapel of Saint Francis of Assisi. It is a little chapel from the 16th century.
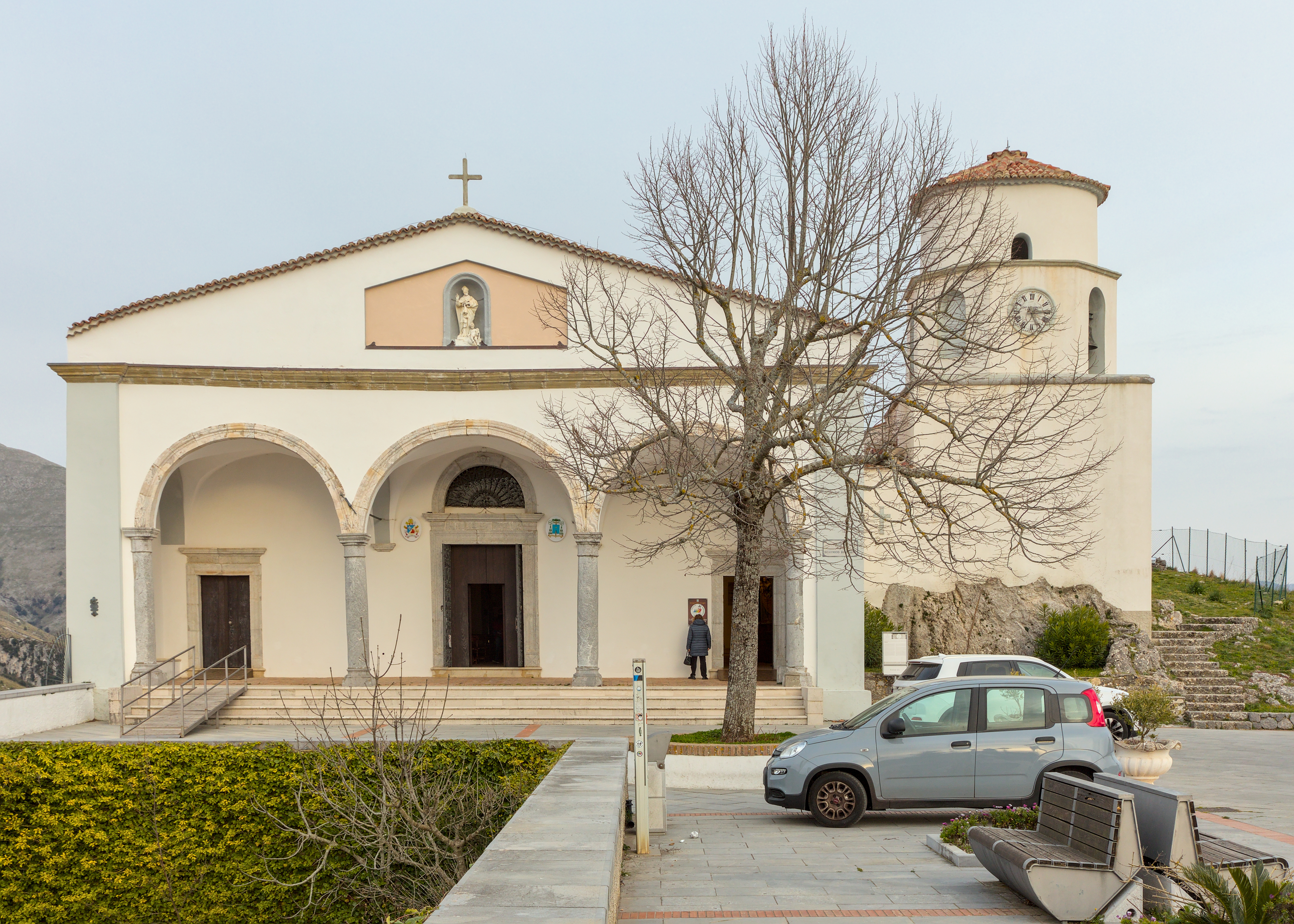
The basilica of Saint Blaise

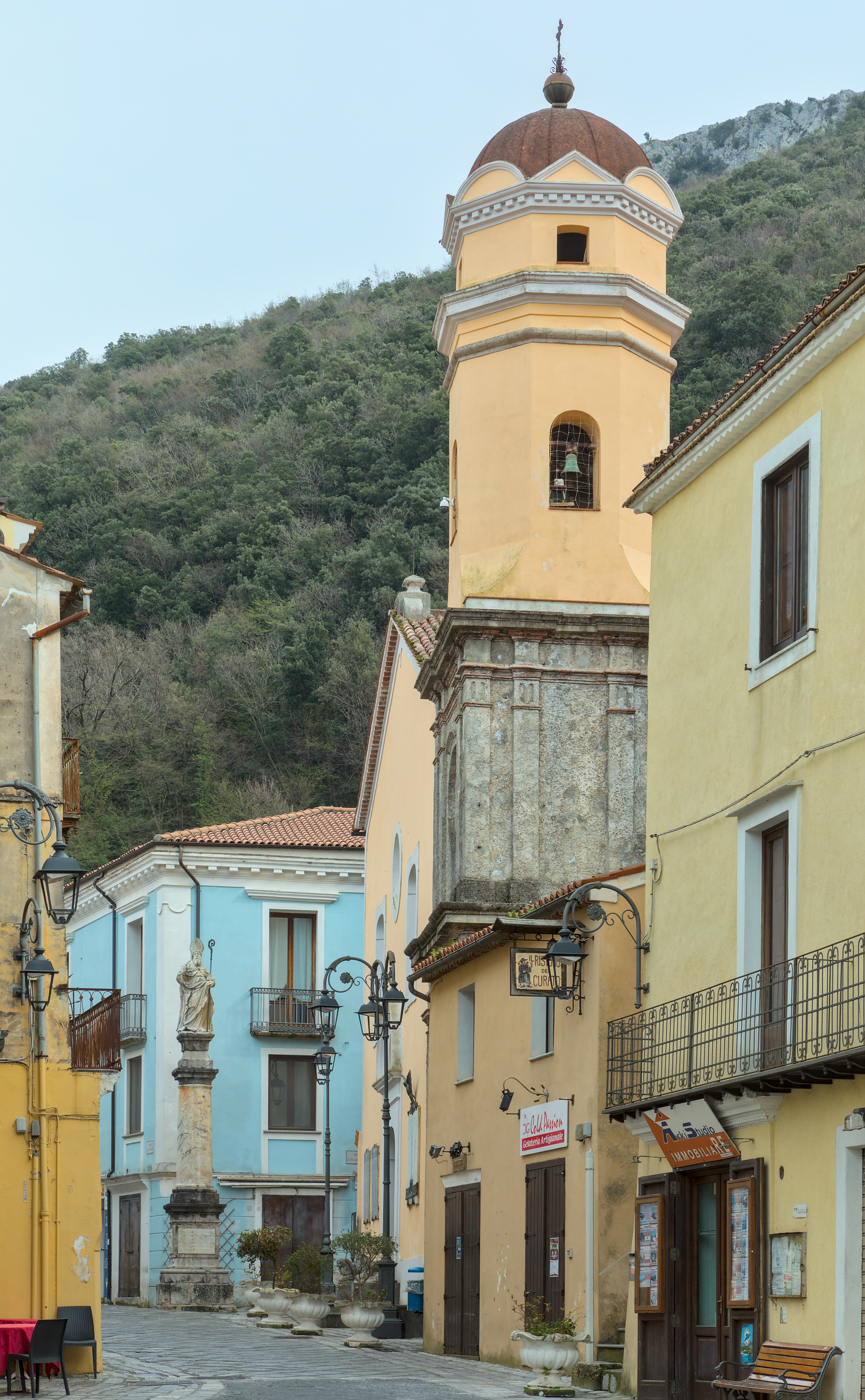
Church of the Holy Annunciation

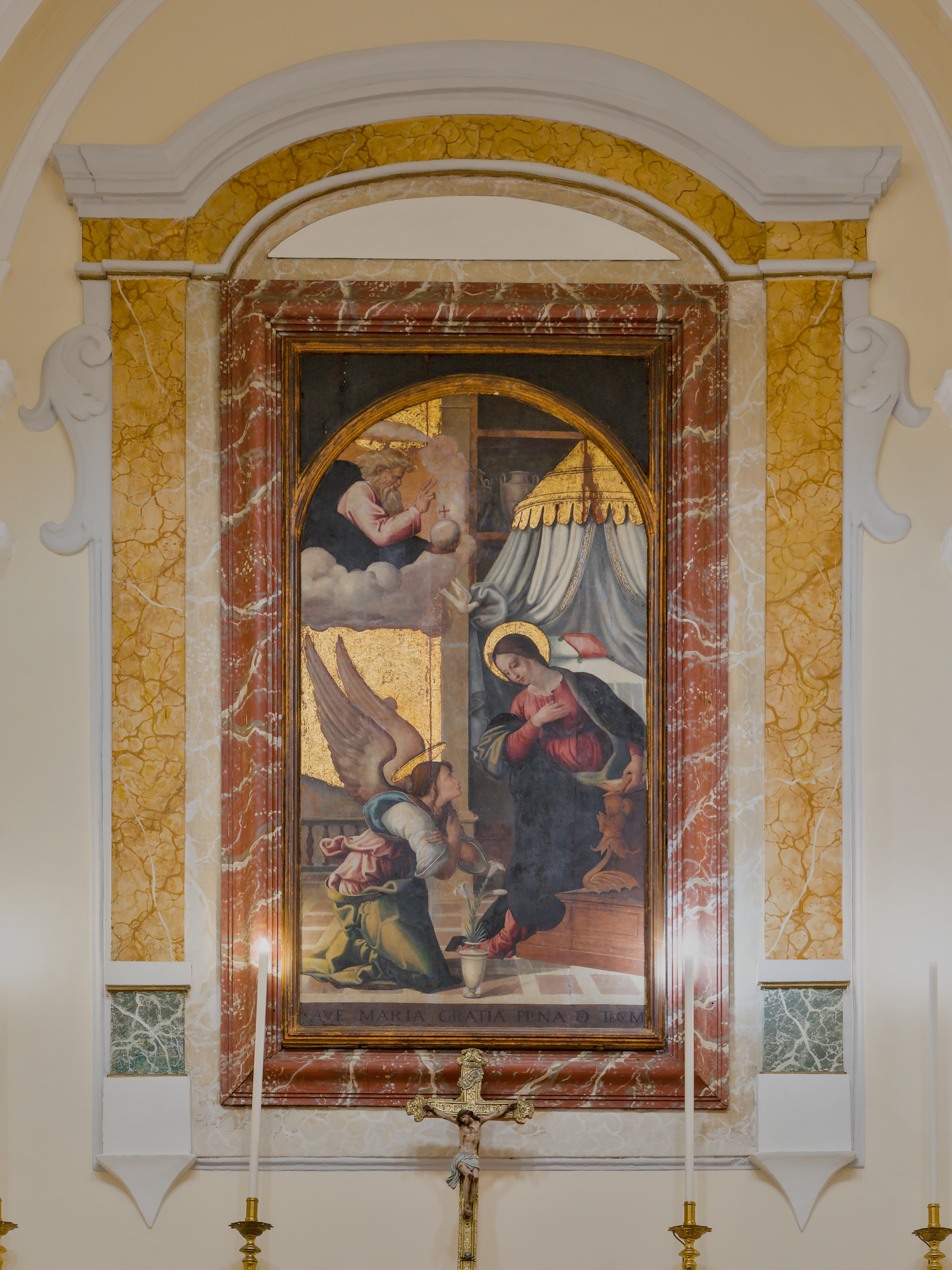
The Annunciation (16th century), in the Church of the Holy Annunciation

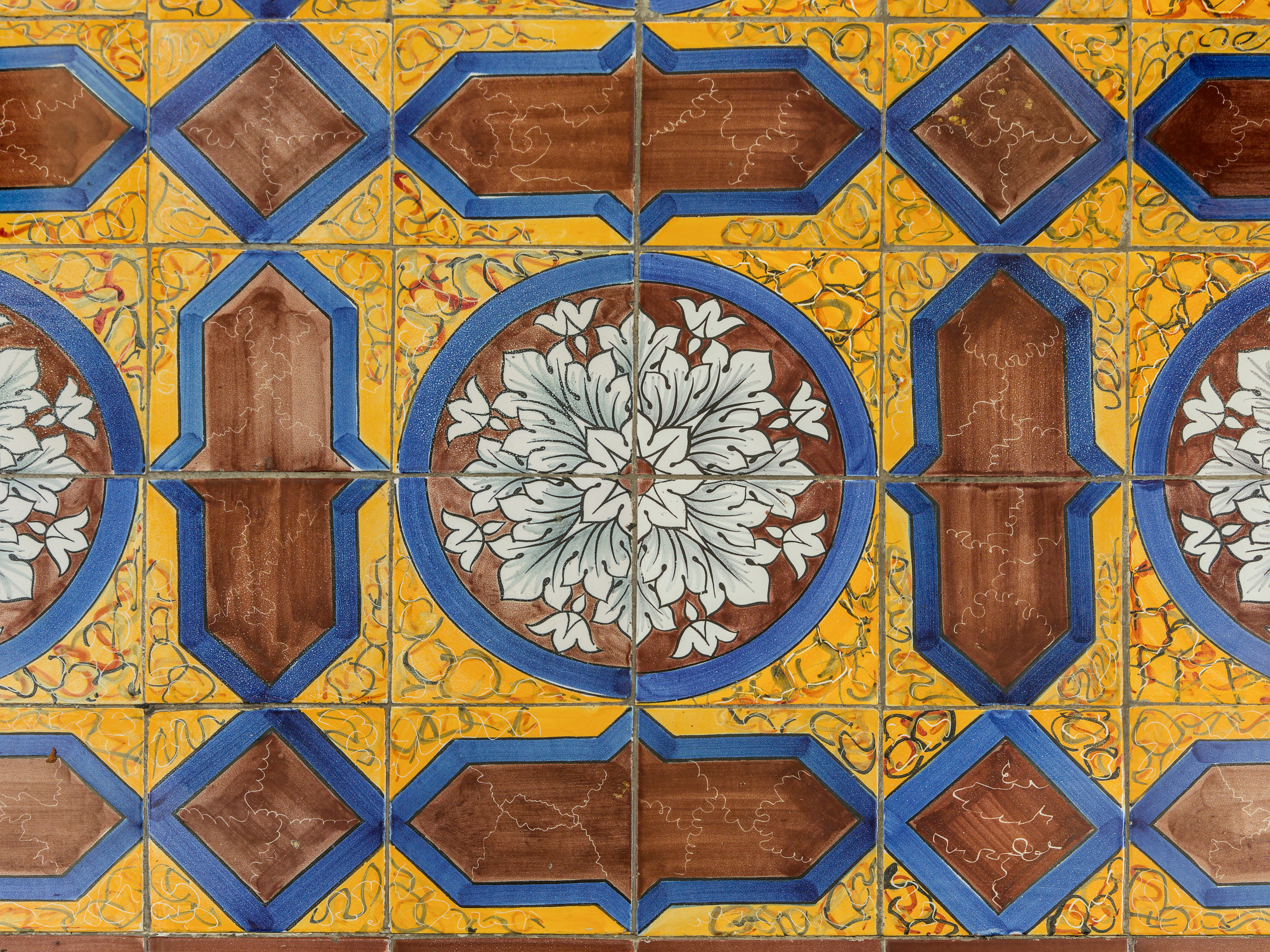
Glazed ceramic tile floor of the Church of the Holy Annunciation

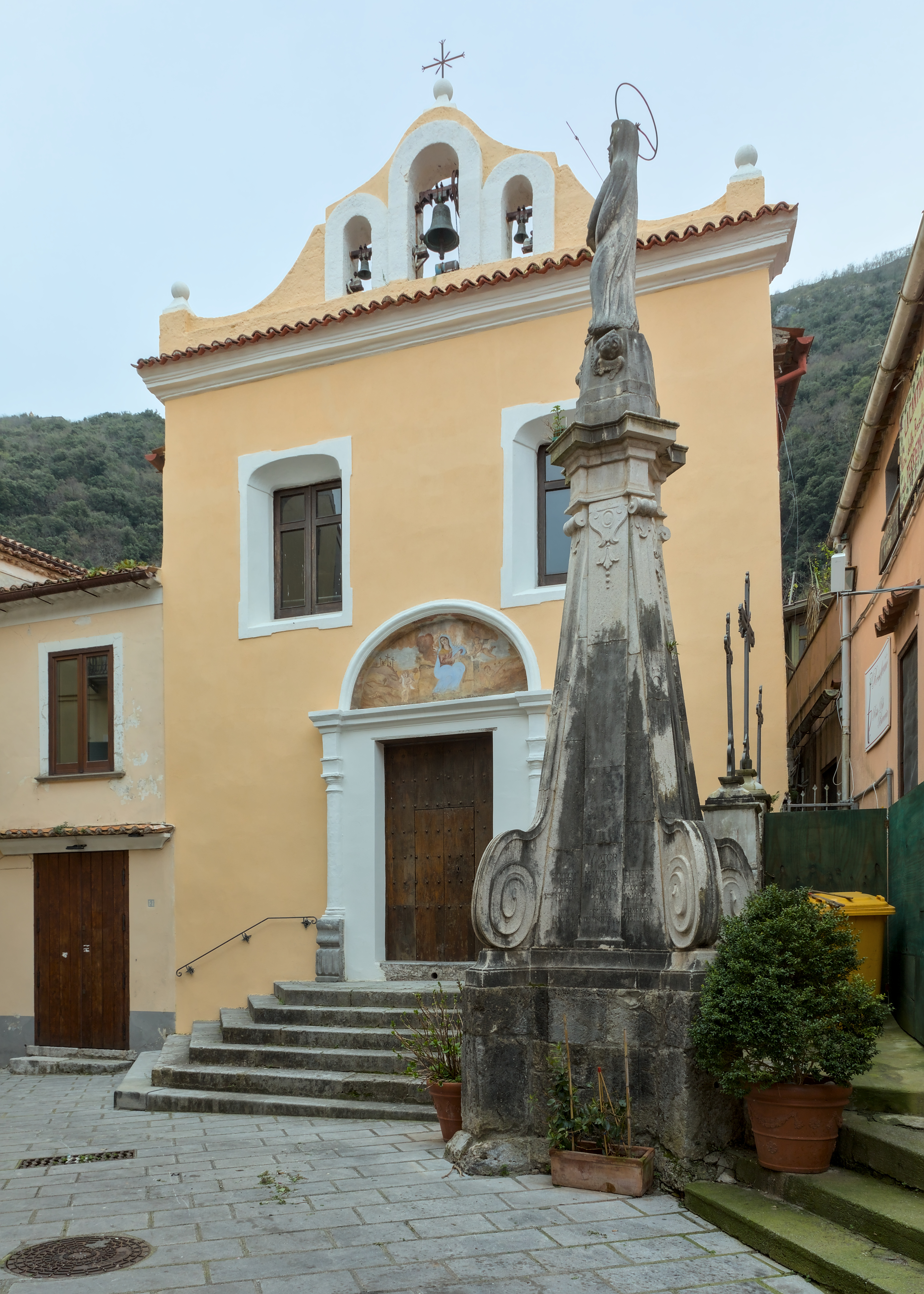
Church of Our Lady of Sorrows

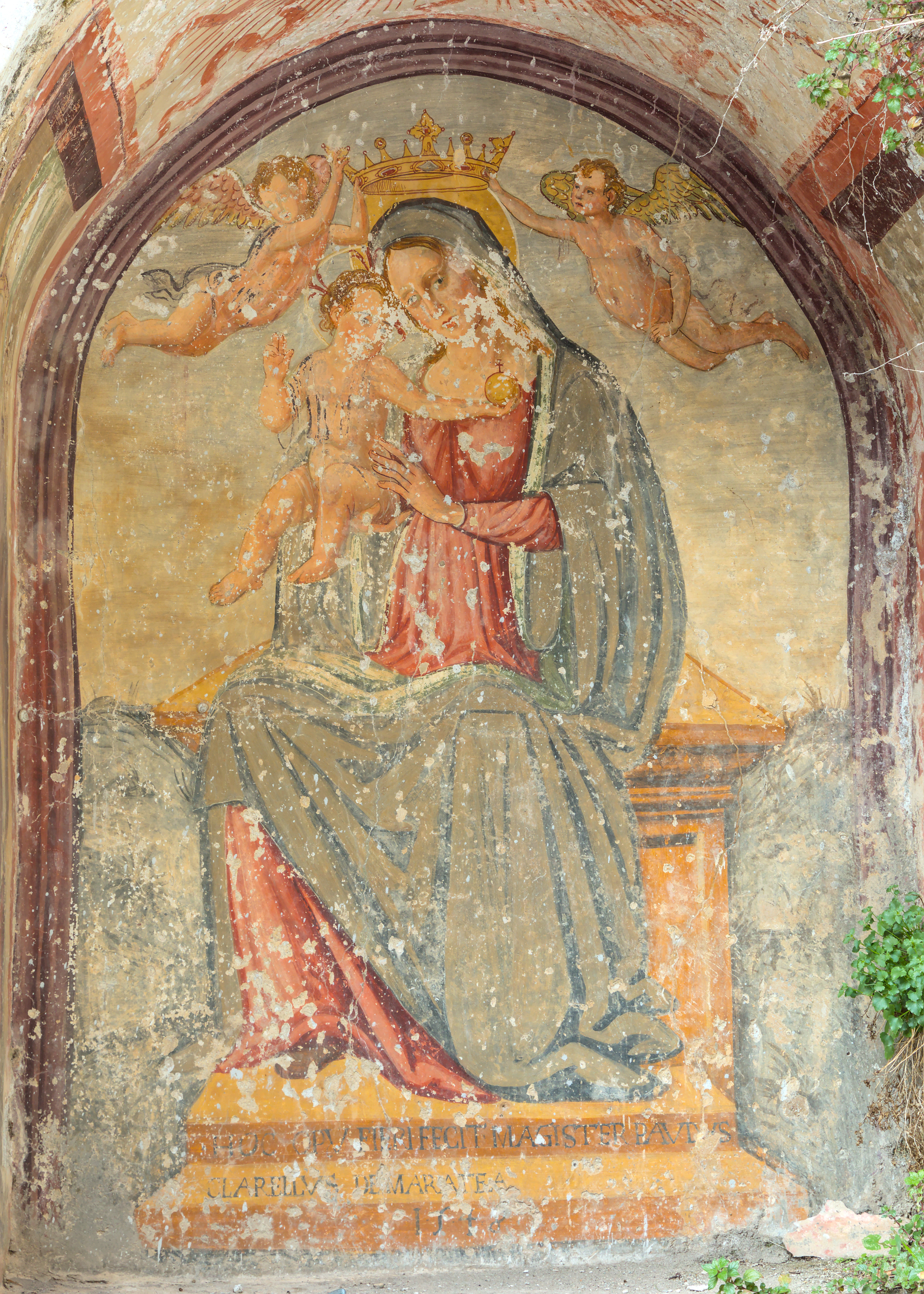
Fresco in a niche on the facade of the church of the Calvary

In the outlying districts are the rest of the churches which complete the list:

- Church of Mary Immaculate, at Acquafredda. It was constructed in 1833, this church conserves the remains of Costabile Carducci
- Church of Our Lady of Sorrows, at Cersuta (17th century)
- Church of the Child Jesus, at Fiumicello, was built in 1953
- Chapel of Our Lady of the Graces, at Fiumicello, built in 1801
- Chapel of Saint Joseph, at Fiumicello (16th century)
- Church of Our Lady of the Safe Harbour, at Porto (16th century).
- Chapel of Our Lady of Loreto, at Porto (17th century)
- Church of Saint Teresa of Ávila, at Marina, built in 1958 after the destruction of the original church
- Chapel of Saint Michael, at Marina (19th century)
- Chapel of Saint Joseph (17th century)
- Chapel of Saint Bartholomew, at Marina (19th century)
- Church of The Immaculate Heart of Mary, at Castrocucco, built in 1992
- Chapel of Saint Jerrard, at Castrocucco (20th century)
- Chapel of Mary Immaculate, at Castrocucco, built in 1926
- Church of Our Lady of Mount Carmel, at Massa, from 1931
- Chapel of Our Lady of Mount Carmel, at Massa (19th century)
- Church of Our Lady of Mercy, in the little Brefaro village. It dates to the late 19th century

=== Other ===
Maratea's territory is also home to six coastal watchtowers, dating to the 16th-17th centuries.

== Frazioni ==
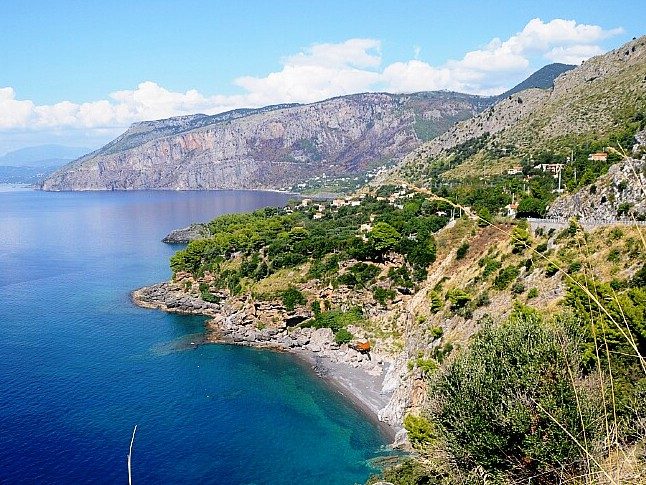
Acquafredda and Cersuta

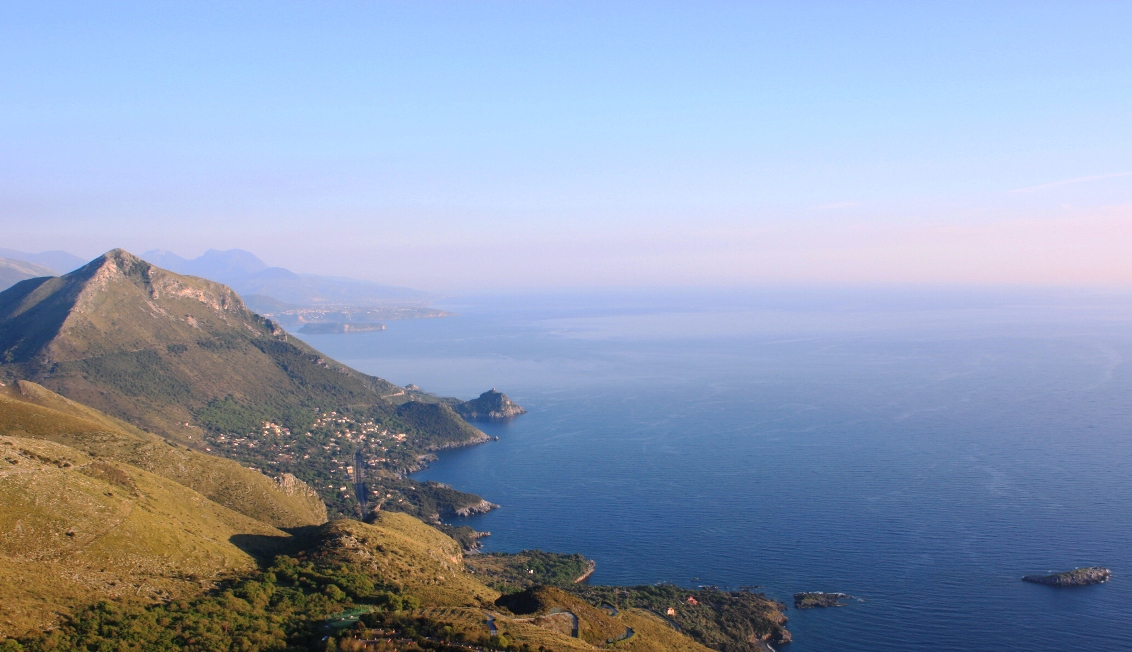
Coastline near Marina

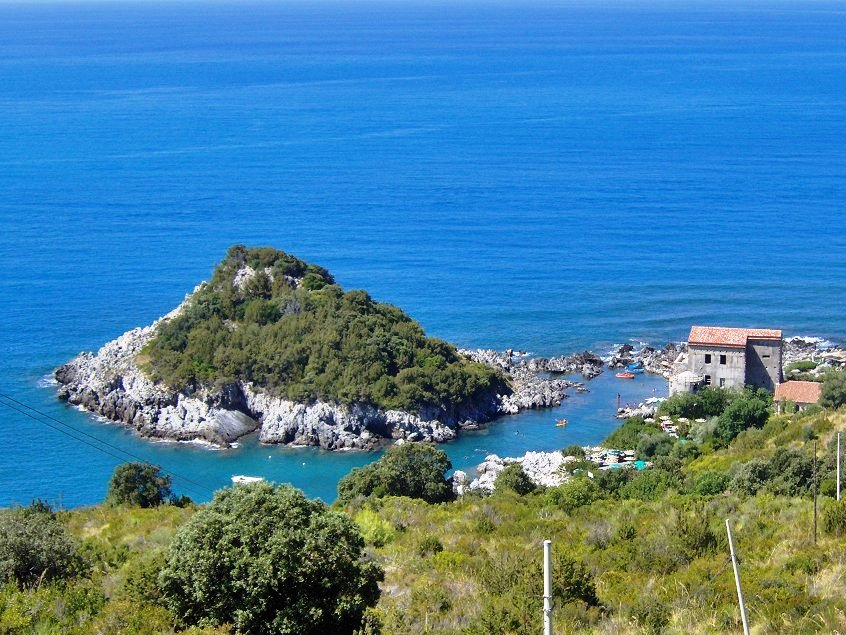
The Secca of Castrocucco

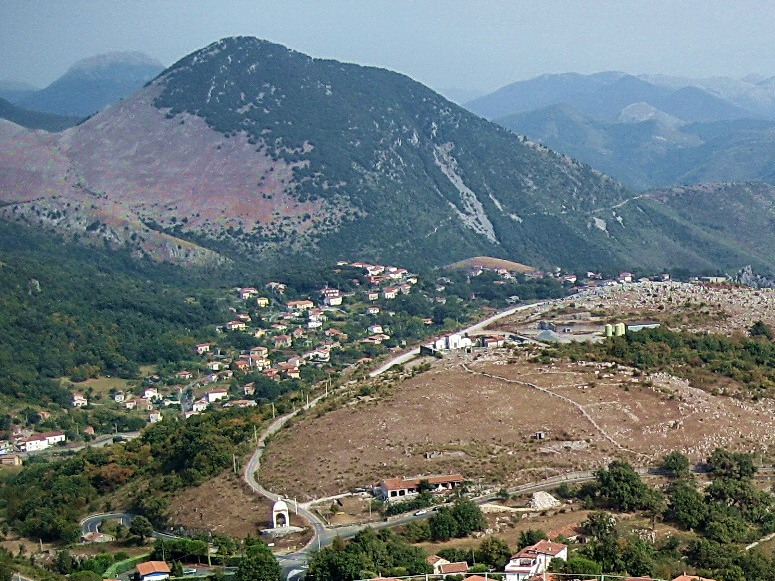
Massa

Maratea has two urban areas: one is located on the top of the mount San Biagio, called Castello; the other one is called Borgo, situated on the north hillside of the same mountain.

Plus, the comune has several little villages, spread across the region.

- Acquafredda

The first outlying district on the northern coast of Maratea is Acquafredda (its name means "cold water"). This village has a wonderful rocky coastline, surrounded by pine forests, and a 19th-century church.

- Cersuta

It is the second frazione on the northern coast of Maratea. Its name means "the land of oaks". It's a little village.

- Fiumicello-Santavenere

Fiumicello (the name means "little river") is located near the harbour. Its development in the 1950s was thanks to the Italian industrialist Stefano Rivetti.

- Porto

Porto (meaning "harbour") is the centre of the local fishing industry, based round the modern harbour of Maratea.

- Marina

Marina is located on the southern coast. It developed between 1894 and 1921, thanks to the opening of the third railway station in Maratea. It has ten beautiful beaches, and an ancient cave.

- Castrocucco

Castrocucco (the name means "the castle on the hillside") is an outlying district, some 10 km (6 mi). along the coast road to the south.

- Santa Caterina

Is the smallest village of Maratea. It is situated on the hillside of Mount San Biagio.

- Massa

The name means "the manor farm", this is the largest outlying district of Maratea.

- Bréfaro

The name means, in ancient Greek, "the high place". This is one of the smaller villages, but it is well known for the production of excellent wine.

== Transport ==
=== Airports ===
The nearest airports are:

- Salerno-Pontecagnano (QSR) 139 km
- Napoli-Capodichino (NAP) 211 km
- Lamezia Terme (SUF) 217 km

== People ==
- Angelina Mango (born 2001), singer-songwriter
- Casimiro Gennari (1839–1914), cardinal of the Roman Catholic Church and was former Prefect of the Congregation of the Council

== Twin towns ==
- Cento, Italy, since 3 February 1980
- Carosino, Italy, since 2001
- Bolzano, Italy, since May 2008

== Sources ==
- Cernicchiaro, José (1979). Conoscere Maratea. Lagonegro.
- Dammiano, Domenico (1965). Maratea nella storia e nella luce della fede. Sapri.
