= Battle of Volta Mantovana (1848) =

1848 Battle of the First Italian War of Independence

- Part of First Italian War of Independence
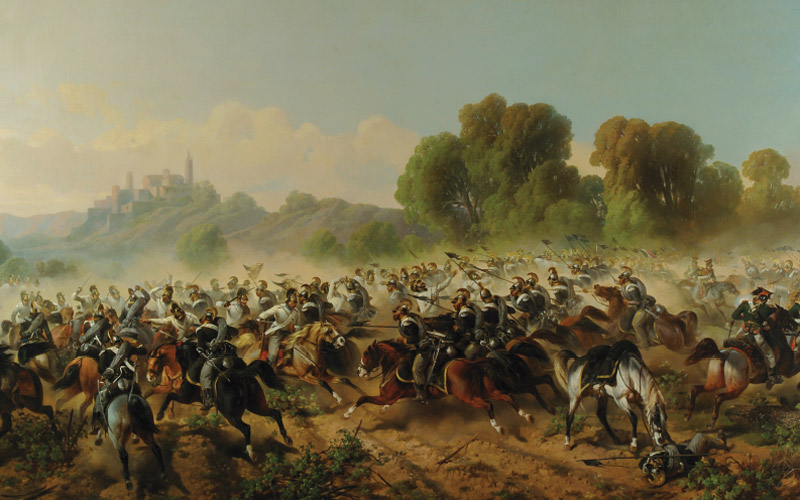
- Charge of the Genova Cavalleria near Volta Mantovana by Felice Cerruti Bauduc
Date	26 and 27 July 1848
Location	Volta Mantovana, Lombardy, Italy 45°19′18″N 10°39′32″E
Result	Austrian victory

Belligerents
Austrian Empire	Kingdom of Sardinia

Commanders and leaders
(Austrian Empire) Konstantin D'Aspré	Ettore de Sonnaz

Strength
15,200 Infantry; 3,800 cavalry 63 artillery pieces	14,500 Infantry; 2,200 cavalry 34 artillery pieces

Casualties and losses
456 killed, wounded and missing.	682 killed and wounded.

The Battle of Volta Mantovana of 1848 was an engagement during the First Italian War of Independence fought throughout Volta Mantovana on 26 and 27 July 1848 between the Second Austrian army corps of General Konstantin D'Aspré and the 3d Piedmontese division of general Ettore De Sonnaz. It resulted in a decisive Austrian victory.

== Background ==
Following their defeat at the battle of Custoza on 24–25 July 1848, Piedmontese forces retreated across the river Mincio. On the morning of the 26th, at a general staff meeting held at Goito, King Charles Albert of Sardinia ordered General De Sonnaz's third corps to march to nearby Volta Mantovana (abandoned by the retreating Piedmontese) and to either cover the Piedmontese retreat or frustrate the Austrian advance across the Mincio, made possible by the nearby Viscontean bridge connecting Valeggio sul Mincio to Borghetto.

== Battle ==
=== 26 July ===
Austrian General Konstantin D'Aspré's Second Army corps had similar orders to secure Volta Mantovana, and troops under his command reached the town shortly before the Piedmontese. An Austrian brigade led by Major General Friedrich von und zu Liechtenstein occupied Volta and some of the morenic hills nearby around 6 pm on the 26th. The brigade was composed of the 2nd Kaiserjäger battalion, the 9th Feldjäger Battalion, the Archduke Franz Karl Infantry regiment and the 2nd company of engineers. A skirmish between Austrian and Piedmontese forces developed into a battle as Konstantin D'Aspré committed reinforcements to defend the town. Historian Diego Soria writes that on the Piedmontese left flank the Infantry Brigade "Savoia" (1st Regiment) led by Colonel Mollard attacked the town in three columns, charging uphill into Austrian fire and driving the Austrians out of the settlement but failing to dislodge "300 Croatians" entrenched in the village church. Soria noted that on the right flank the Infantry Brigade "Savona" (17th regiment), two companies of the Brigade "Parma" and volunteers attacked the Austrian position, capturing at least part of the town. The Austrian account of Dr. Schneidawind also states that the Savoia reached the village and captured several homesteads, but reinforcements from the Kinsky infantry regiment and the Szluiner grenzregiment (The Slunj border troops) threw the Piedmontese back. He noted that the attack of the "Savona" from the right flank of the Piedmontese via Sottomonte and Luccone was successful and the Piedmontese entered into town. As a result, the battle continued throughout the night, house by house. Both accounts agree that by 2 am the Piedmontese left the elevated positions, unable to hold onto their gains.

=== 27 July ===
The battle proper commenced again at dawn after the 3d Piedmontese Division had been reinforced by 6 battalions of the Piedmontese "Brigata Regina". 6 Battalions of the Regina and 2 Battalions of the 3d Division attacked the Austrian positions, then heavily reinforced by the troops of the Kerpan Brigade (commanded by Major-General Joseph Ritter von Kerpan) and the Schwarzenberg brigade (commanded by Edmund Leopold Friedrich count of Schwarzenberg), all shadowed by further Austrian forces. By 6 am the Piedmontese assault on Volta Mantovana had been decisively defeated, and the Austrians counter-attacked. Soria writes that the battle was the "bloodiest engagement of the entire war" ("ce combat de Volta fut le plus acharné de tous") and that the Piedmontese suffered 1,000 casualties between killed and wounded. The Piedmontese retreated towards Goito, but during the retreat, they were attacked by the Prince Reuss Hussars, the Kaiser Uhlans, and the King Ludwig of Bavaria dragoons. The cavalry attacks were repulsed by Piedmontese cavalry charges - the first one by the 2nd cavalry regiment "Genova", the second by the 1st cavalry Regiment "Savoia". A third was purportedly driven off by a Piedmontese square. Austrian accounts counted 77 dead, 175 wounded, 202 missing or unaccounted for (with most of the casualties coming from the 2nd Kaiserjäger battalion and the Archduke Franz Carl infantry regiment). No accurate Piedmontese count of the casualties is available.

== Aftermath ==
Piedmontese General Eusebio Bava recounted in his memoirs that insofar as the Piedmontese had already obtained two victories on the Mincio (at the battle of Goito bridge and at Goito) they were confident of victory. The news that the heights and great part of the village had been captured on the night of the 26th fostered further expectations of success, dashed in the morning of the 27th as the Piedmontese were forced to withdraw. Bava noted that on the morning of the 27th a great many "fleeing soldiers of the Regina and Savoia brigade could be seen", that many Piedmontese soldiers escaping Volta could not be rallied and effectively deserted, fleeing "right up as far as Piedmont", and that surviving soldiers complained of starvation and lack of victuals. Bava observed a breakdown of discipline. Defeated on the Mincio, the bulk of the Piedmontese forces then concentrated at Goito retreated westwards towards a defensive line on the river Oglio.
