= Bauduc =

Bauduc may refer to:

- Felice Cerruti Bauduc, Italian painter
- Ray Bauduc, drummer
- Château Bauduc estate, near Bordeaux
