= Miss Grand Veneto =

Italian regional beauty pageant

- Formation: June 2019; 7 years ago
- Founder: Enzo Lamberto
- Type: Beauty pageant
- Headquarters: Padua
- Location: Italy
- Members: Miss Grand Italy
- Official language: Italian
- Director: Enzo Lamberto (2019); Giulio Romi (2022); Domenico Poggiana (2023–2024)

Miss Grand Veneto is an Italian regional female beauty pageant, founded in 2019 by an Padua-based event organizer, Pubblistar 2000, led by Enzo Lamberto. The winners of the contest represent the region of Veneto in the Miss Grand Italy national pageant.

Since the inception of the Miss Grand Italy pageant, Veneto candidates have never won the title yet; however, the placements they obtained in the national contest remain unclarified due to a lack of national competition results publicized by both regional and national organizers.

== History ==
After Miss Grand Italy's director, Giuseppe Puzio, began franchising the regional competitions to local organizers in 2019, the license for the Veneto region was granted to a local organizer, Enzo Lamberto, who then organized the region-level pageants in Padua and Treviso to select the region representatives for that year's national competition.

In 2022, after two consecutive years of absence, Veneto returned to the competition with the leadership of Giulio Romi, chairperson of the Fashion Lady Eventi. However, Giulio lost the license to Domenico Poggiana the following year.

Several local auditions and contests were organized annually to determine the finalists for the Miss Grand Veneto pageant

== Editions ==
The following table details Miss Grand Veneto's annual editions since 2019.

Edition	Date	Final venue	Entrants	Winner	Ref.
1st	18 April 2019	Via Guizza Conselvana 441, Padua (PD)	No data available		
1st	25 April 2019	Ponte Ottavi Restaurant, Treviso (TV)	No data available		
2nd (Note: Held parallelly with the Miss Grand Trentino-South Tyrol 2022 pageant.)	3 September 2022	Picoverde Water Park, Sommacampagna (VR)	No data available		
3rd (Note: Held parallelly with the Miss Grand Trentino-South Tyrol 2023 and Miss Grand Friuli-Venezia Giulia 2023 pageants.)	28 May 2023	Hotel Villa Pigalle, Belvedere (VI)	No data available		
4th (Note: As the regional finals for the regions of Veneto and Trentino-South Tyrol)	1 October 2023	Hotel Restaurant Villa dei Pini, Molo (VI)	N/A	Anna Toniutti	

== National competition ==
The following is a list of representatives of the region of Veneto in the Miss Grand Italy national pageant.

Year	Representative	Original state title	Placement at Miss Grand Italy	Ref.
2019	Giulia Zancato	Winners of the 2019 Miss Grand Veneto qualification stage	No data available	
2019	Linda Sovegni	Winners of the 2019 Miss Grand Veneto qualification stage	No data available	
2022	Selma Aingound	Winners of the 2022 Miss Grand Veneto qualification stage	No data available	
2022	Evelina Rezheenskaya	Winners of the 2022 Miss Grand Veneto qualification stage	No data available	
2022	Alessia Alberti	Winners of the 2022 Miss Grand Veneto qualification stage	No data available	
2023	Anna Toniutti	Winners of the 2023 Miss Grand Veneto and Trentino-Alto Adige qualification stage	No data available	
2023	Arianna Musobelliu	Winners of the 2023 Miss Grand Veneto and Trentino-Alto Adige qualification stage	No data available	
2023	Eleonora Perusin	Winners of the 2023 Miss Grand Veneto and Trentino-Alto Adige qualification stage	No data available	
2023	Serena Forzutti	Winners of the 2023 Miss Grand Veneto and Trentino-Alto Adige qualification stage	No data available	
2023	Stefania Carausu	Winners of the 2023 Miss Grand Veneto and Trentino-Alto Adige qualification stage	No data available	
2023	Valentina Fabbri	Winners of the 2023 Miss Grand Veneto and Trentino-Alto Adige qualification stage	No data available	
2024	Anna Toniutti	Miss Grand Veneto 2024	2nd runner-up	
