= Battles of Vicenza (1848) =

Battles of the First Italian War of Independence

Austrians take La Rotonda (10 June)

In the first (20–21 May), second (23–24 May) and third (10–11 June) battles of Vicenza of 1848, the city, which had given its allegiance to the Republic of San Marco, was attacked by the Austrian Empire. This took place during the First Italian War of Independence amidst the revolutions of 1848. The city was defended by Giovanni Durando with volunteer troops and a contingent of the Swiss Guard from the Papal State. The attackers were under the personal command of Marshal Joseph Radetzky. After being repulsed in the first two battles, the Austrians conquered Vicenza with the third battle.

== First battle ==
An Austrian army under Count Georg von Thurn und Valsassina decamped from Treviso on the evening of 18 May. In response, Durando ordered volunteers from Padua brought to Vicenza by rail to join the civic guard. Crossing the Brenta, the Austrians attempted to take Vicenza by force on 20 May. In the fighting in the suburb of Santa Lucia, the Austrians lost 100 men from a Croat battalion, the Italians slightly less.

Thurn decided to bypass Vicenza to the north and advance towards fortified Verona, part of the Austrian defensive system known as the Quadrilatero. Durando arrived at Vicenza on 21 May; too late to prevent Thurn's advance. President Daniele Manin arrived that same day from Venice by train to bolster morale. Durando sent General Giacomo Antonini to harass the Austrian rear at Olmo. He lost an arm in the fighting, while Manin and Niccolò Tommaseo accompanied him.

== Second battle ==
The battle at La Rocchetta (part of the medieval wall) on 24 May, as painted by Agostino Bottazzi

Although Thurn's army of 18,000 successfully reached San Bonifacio, Marshal Radetzky ordered them to take Vicenza and did not allow them in Verona. On the night of 23–24 May, the Austrians occupied the Vicentine suburb of San Felice and bombarded the city from the west. More than forty cannons launched over 3,000 shells into the city, but as the shells were of low quality, little damage was inflicted. An Italian battery under the command of a Swiss captain named Lentulus returned fire, silencing the Austrian batteries near the railway station.

The defenders diverted water from the Retrone river to flood the area north of the Berici Hills. Late in the morning, the Austrians attacked the Castello and Santa Croce gates, part of medieval walls, but were repulsed. An Italian sally forced their retreat to Verona, where Radetzky opened the gates.

== Third battle ==
At the end of May, Radetzky launched an offensive in the west against Sardo-Piedmontese forces, but this was halted at the battle of Goito. The Austrians then retreated south of Vicenza, cutting off the city from Padua and thus from reinforcements. Radetzky sent a part of his army back to Verona, which caused King Charles Albert of Sardinia to believe that the marshal himself had retreated to the fortress.

Durando's last orders from Venice, dated 7 June, were to hold Vicenza. In his belief, he could hold it for three or four days at most, although the Charles Albert acted on the assumption that it could be held for five or six. The Sardo-Piedmontese forces began leisurely marching towards Verona on 7 June.

The Austrian army that attacked Vicenza was under Radetzky's personal command and numbered 30,000 men and 124 cannon, including 3,000 cavalry. These forces were the 1st and 2nd Corps and two brigades of the 3rd Corps. The 1st Corps advanced from the south against the Berici Hills, while the 2nd Corps attacked from the east. The defenders under Durando had 11,000 men and 36 cannon. About half of these were regular troops and half volunteers. Among the regulars was Durando's contingent of Swiss Guards. Morale within Vicenza was high.

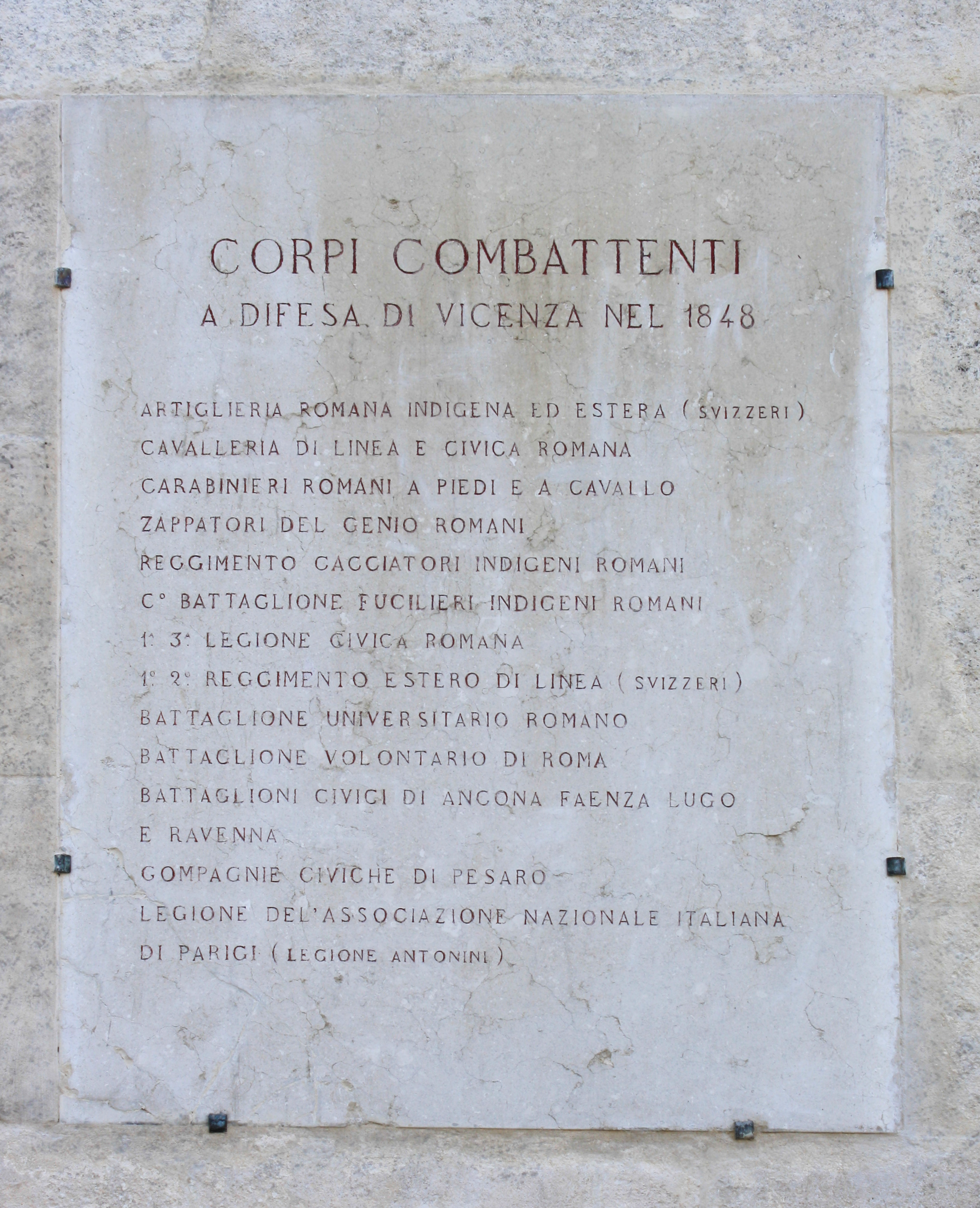
Plaque commemorating the defenders of Vicenza

The Austrians approached Vicenza from the south and east, cutting it off from both Padua and Treviso. General Karl von Culoz advanced on the Berici Hills, while Generals Eduard Clam-Gallas and Ludwig von Wohlgemuth followed the banks of the Bacchiglione to force the defenders of the Berici Hills to retreat into the city. Durando defended the eastern suburbs with barricades manned by civic guards, volunteers and some Swiss Guards. Most of the Swiss, however, were sent to defend the Berici Hills. They took up positions on the crest of the hill and in the Villa La Rotonda and Villa Valmarana ai Nani. On the hill, they built a wooden fort at a place called Bella Vista and occupied the Villa Guiccioli.

The Austrian attack began at dawn on 10 June. By 0700 hours, the Italians had retreated from Bella Vista. Radetzky then ordered Culoz to pause while the Austrians took up positions to the east and north of the city. An attack on all three fronts began at 1400 hours. Clam-Gallas bombarded and captured La Rotonda, whose defenders retreated to the Valmarana. Taking Valmarana, he joined up with Wohlgemuth at the Monte and Lupia gates, having turned the flank of the defenders in the Berici Hills.

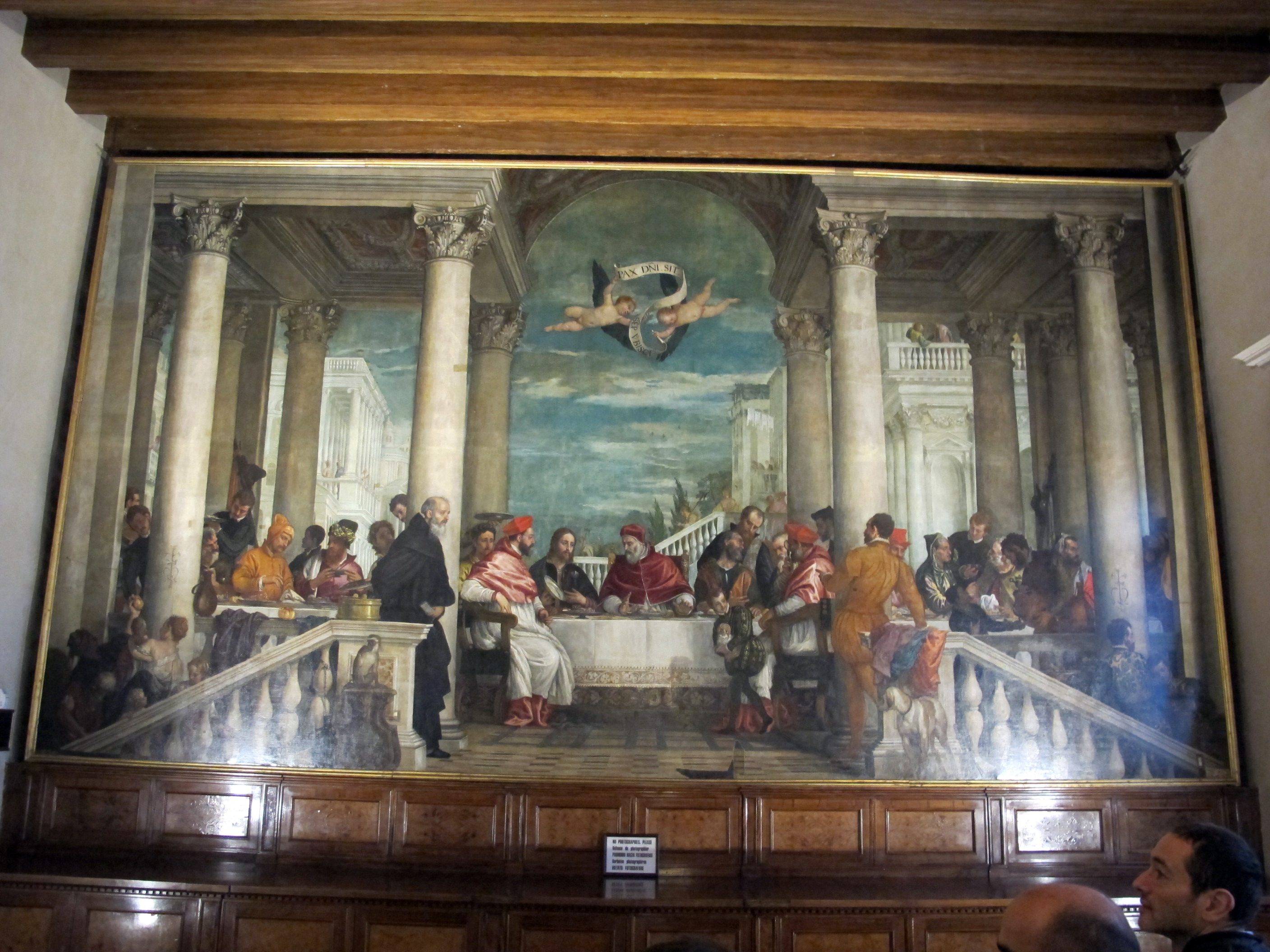
The repaired Feast of Saint Gregory the Great today

On the crest of the hill, the Swiss attempted to retake Bella Vista but were repulsed. The Austrians then took Villa Guiccioli. The defending commanders, Colonels Enrico Cialdini and Massimo d'Azeglio, were severely wounded. Around 1700 hours, the remaining troops withdrew to the Sanctuary of the Madonna del Monte at the foot of the crest. There they were joined by Durando with the reserves. Fighting took place in the church, where the Austrians accused the Servites of aiding the defenders. Some indignant Croat soldiers hacked to pieces the monumental painting The Feast of Saint Gregory the Great by Paolo Veronese. Meanwhile, the 2nd Corps's attack from the east of the city was repulsed.

With the heights to the south lost, Durando raised the white flag on the Torre Bissara at 1900 hours. The citizens, however, took shots at the flag and the Committee of Defence ordered it replaced by the red flag. In response, Durando opened negotiations with the Austrians. It was agreed that the Papal troops would march out with the honours of war and be given free passage to Padua provided they did not engage in war against Austria for the next three months. Although these generous terms have been seen as an act of deference to the pope, they served a military purpose: freeing up Radetzky for three months to confront the Sardo-Piedmontese.

On 11 June, Durando's forces, 9,000 in number, marched out of Vicenza via the Monte gate. They were joined by some refugees. The city was occupied by Austria. The whole of the Veneto soon followed.

The Italian casualties at the third battle of Vicenza amounted to 293 dead and 1,665 wounded, while on the Austrian side 141 were dead, 541 wounded and 140 missing (deserted). The Emperor Franz Joseph had a monument erected by the Sanctuary of the Madonna to commemorate the troops. The Prussian attaché with the Austrians, General Karl Wilhelm von Willisen, commended the fighting quality of the defenders: "the Austrians had to use 12,000 men to dislodge a handful of brave sons of Switzerland and Italy".
