= Volta Mantovana =

- Comune
- Comune di Volta Mantovana
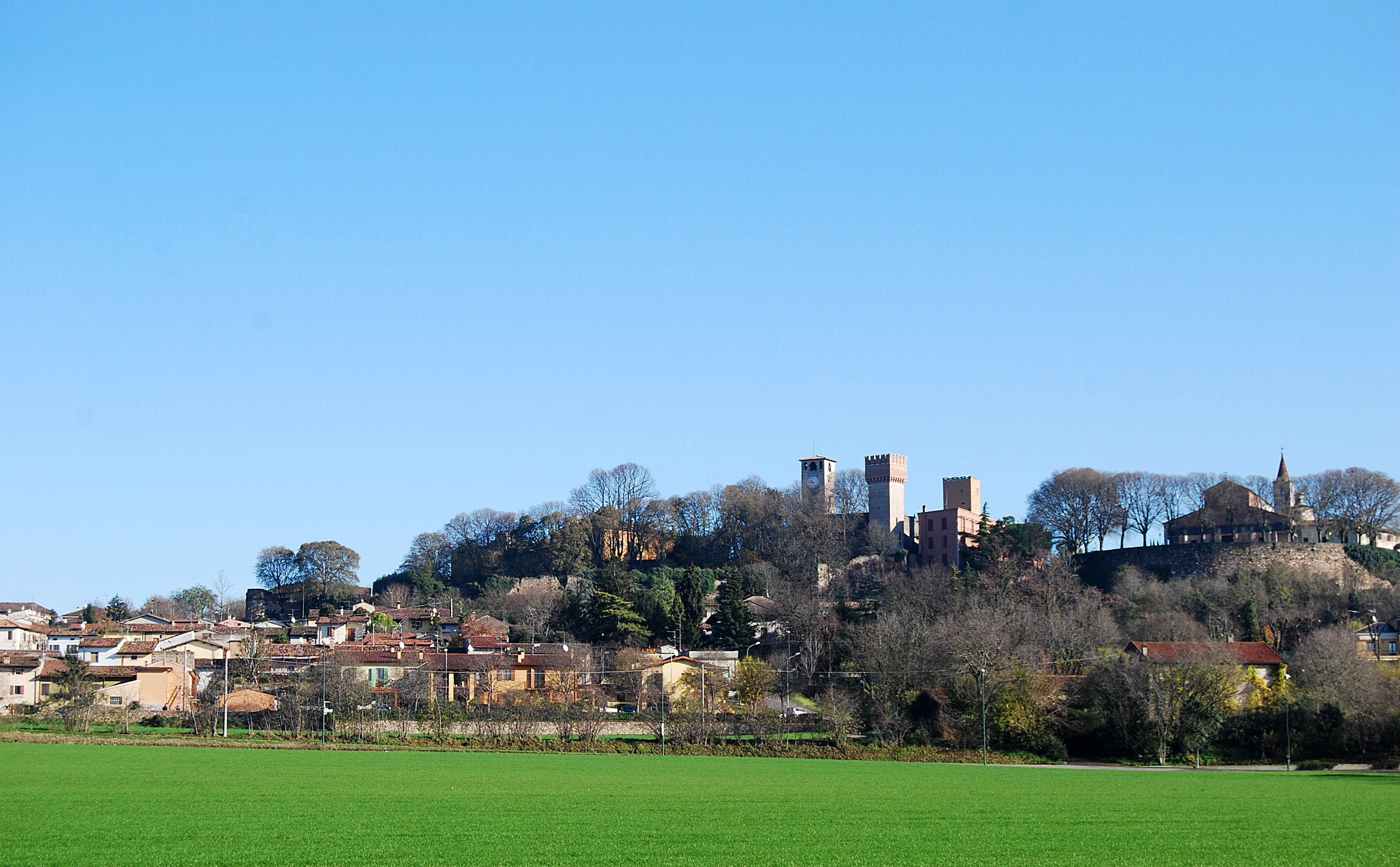

- Coat of arms

- Location within Italy Location within Lombardy
- Coordinates: 45°19′N 10°39′E
- Country: Italy
- Region: Lombardy
- Province: Mantua (MN)
- Frazioni: Cereta, Castelgrimaldo, Foresto, Ferri-Falzoni

Government
  - Mayor: Luciano Bertaiola

Area
  - Total: 50.3 km^{2} (19.4 sq mi)
- Elevation: 91 m (299 ft)

Population (31 July 2014)
  - Total: 7,413
  - Density: 147/km^{2} (382/sq mi)
- Demonym: Voltesi
- Time zone: UTC+1 (CET)
  - Summer (DST): UTC+2 (CEST)
- Postal code: 46049
- Dialing code: 0376
- Website: Official website

Volta Mantovana (Upper Mantovano: La Ólta) is a comune (municipality) in the Province of Mantua in the Italian region of Lombardy, located about 120 km (75 mi) east of Milan and about 20 km (12 mi) northwest of Mantua.

Volta Mantovana borders the municipalities of Cavriana, Goito, Marmirolo, Monzambano, and Valeggio sul Mincio.

== Etymology ==
In Italian, the word volta means "a turn" or "a bend." The name of Volta Mantovana is believed to originate from either a bend in the river Mincio, or a turn in the road running alongside between Mantua and Goito to the south and Monzambano and Peschiera to the north.

== History ==
The Volta Mantovana area has been inhabited since the Bronze Age.

=== Neolithic period ===
A vast mid-to-late Bronze Age site was excavated in 1955 and 1956 on an island in the Mincio river located between Volta Mantovana (Mantua province, Lombardy) and Borghetto, a frazione (subdivision) of Valeggio sul Mincio, in the province of Verona, Veneto. The discovery of the site, located in the localitá Isolone del Mincio (sometimes known as Isolone Delle Moradelle o Prevalese) was a significant archaeological find and helped prompt further research into the Bronze Age history of the area between the rivers Mincio and Po, and Lake Garda. Local historian Cesare Farinelli estimated in his History of Valeggio that around 16,000 archaeological remains (mostly ceramic shards and stone objects) were recovered. While the site at Isolone del Mincio was later destroyed by construction, excavations at Bande di Cavriana and Castellaro Lagusello in Monzambano led to the recovery of two similar Bronze Age sites associated with the Polada culture and which were subsequently preserved as archaeological sites.

=== Antiquity ===
An Iron Age tomb excavated in Volta Mantovana has been referred to as the northernmost find of definitive Etruscan remains. A small number of Roman finds (connected with burials and a possible necropolis) are in the collections of the archaeological museum at Cavriana.

=== Middle Ages ===
In the Middle Ages, a castle was erected in Volta Mantovana; it was built in the 11th century and converted in the 14th–15th centuries. The castle existed in 1053 when Countess Beatrice of Lorraine, wife of Boniface III of Tuscany and holder of comital rights over the Imperial county of Mantua (and the greater part of the Po valley) donated her seigneurial estate, castle, and chapel at Volta (Curtis cum Castro et cappella) to the bishop of Mantua, a donation seemingly confirmed by another edict in 1073. Beatrice's daughter Matilda of Tuscany still maintained possessions in Volta, donating rights over the labour of the serfs of Volta to the canons of the Church of Saint Peter in Mantua in 1079.

During the investiture controversy, the Battle of Volta Mantovana took place in October 1080. According to the Chronicon of Bernold of Constance (who mentions the battle as taking place "apud Vultam propre Mantuam") and in the Liber ad Amicum of Bonizo of Sutri, an army of Lombard forces loyal to Emperor Henry IV defeated the troops of Matilda of Tuscany near the castle. Matilda's defeat allowed Henry IV to enter the March of Verona unopposed, marching down the Brenner pass in March and reaching Verona for Easter, on 4 April 1081, before entering Milan and receiving homage from the Lombard cities ten days later.

=== Renaissance and Early Modern Period ===
During the Renaissance, after the Venetian ceded the town and castle to the Gonzaga, Ludovico III Gonzaga built a palace in the town, adding a large park in the 16th century. In the 17th century, a Franciscan convent was established outside town, and an Ursuline nunnery was built within the town walls. In 1708, Volta Mantovana became part of Austrian Lombardy following the dissolution of the Duchy of Mantua.

=== Risorgimento and Liberal Italy ===
Following the Sardinian defeat in the 1848 battle of Custoza, the retreating Piedmontese crossed the Mincio to reconnect with their forces then besieging Mantua and to concentrate at Goito. On the morning of 26 July, the third division of General Ettore De Sonnaz was ordered to occupy Volta Mantovana and to either cover a retreat or frustrate the Austrian advance. In the ensuing Battle of Volta Mantovana, the Austrians forced the Savoyards to retreat towards a new defensive line behind the river Oglio.

Volta Mantovana was the home of the radical Italian politician Ivanoe Bonomi, who was born into one of the town's affluent landholding families and became the most prominent political figure in early 20th century Mantua. Bonomi, a reformist socialist, broke with the mainstream Italian Socialist movement in the early 1900s when he became an advocate of Italian colonialism and of Italian participation in the First World War. Bonomi emerged as the most influential national spokesperson for "democratic interventionism" (interventismo democratico), a position that also influenced Benito Mussolini. His ambiguous attitude towards fascism as Home Secretary in the Giolitti government and then, in 1921, as prime minister is often cited as one of the reasons behind fascism's seizure of power. After Mussolini's seizure of power, Bonomi withdrew from politics, emerging in the 1940s as an anti-fascist and helping organize the 25 July 1943 coup. After the war, Bonomi became the first president of the Italian Senate and was buried in Volta Mantovana following his death in 1951.

=== Fascism ===
During the disturbances that preceded the fascist seizure of power, Volta Mantovana was briefly occupied by fascist militias. On 4 June 1921, a local named Ardiccio Magri purportedly wounded two fascist activists, Ettore Morganti and Vittorio Ferrari, during a brawl. The provincial committee of the Fascist Party of Mantua accused the leaders of the local branch of the Catholic Italian People's Party and local parish priest, Don Cesare Ferrari of inciting violence and dispatched all local squadristi to Volta. After five days of violence and intimidation, the local municipal government of the Italian People's Party resigned to be replaced by a commissar, while Don Cesare Ferrari was withdrawn from the parish.

== Main sights ==
- Palazzo Gonzaga-Guerrieri (15th century), was built by Louis III of Mantua. In 1515, his heirs donated it to Ludovico Guerrieri, the local commissar of the Gonzaga. It returned to a cadet branch of the Gonzaga in 1860 and today houses the town hall.
- Castello di Volta Mantovana (erected at the latest during the 11th century), is connected with the struggle between Matilda of Tuscany and Henry IV. The castle was briefly occupied by a Venetian garrison before being turned over to the Gonzaga Marquis of Mantova in 1450.
- Chiesa di Santa Maria Maddalena, constructed in the Romanesque style, was transformed in the 15th century before being renovated in the 18th century to include three naves and more chapels and altars. The church features 15th- and 16th-century frescoes and a picture of the Assumption of the Virgin, which is attributed to Guercino.
