= Sommacampagna =

- Comune
- Comune di Sommacampagna
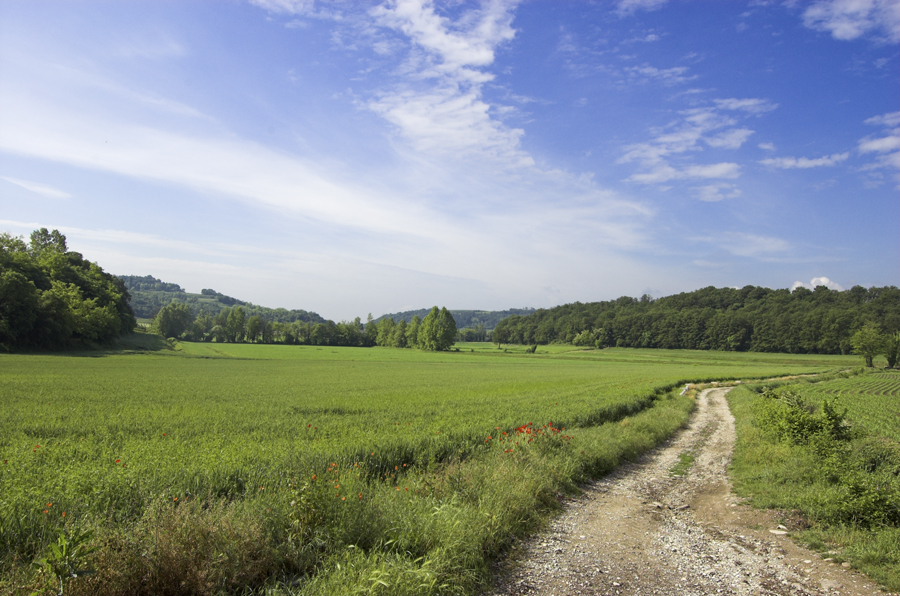
- Hills between Sona and Sommacampagna.

- Coat of arms

- Sommacampagna within the Province of Verona

- Location within Italy Location within Veneto
- Coordinates: 45°24′18.7″N 10°50′45.7″E
- Country: Italy
- Region: Veneto
- Province: Verona (VR)
- Frazioni: Caselle, Custoza

Government
  - Mayor: Graziella Manzato

Area
  - Total: 40.91 km^{2} (15.80 sq mi)
- Elevation: 121 m (397 ft)

Population (2017)
  - Total: 14,746
  - Density: 360.4/km^{2} (933.6/sq mi)
- Demonym: Sommacampagnesi
- Time zone: UTC+1 (CET)
  - Summer (DST): UTC+2 (CEST)
- Postal code: 37066
- Dialing code: 045
- Patron saint: St. Andrew the Apostle
- Saint day: 30 November
- Website: Official website

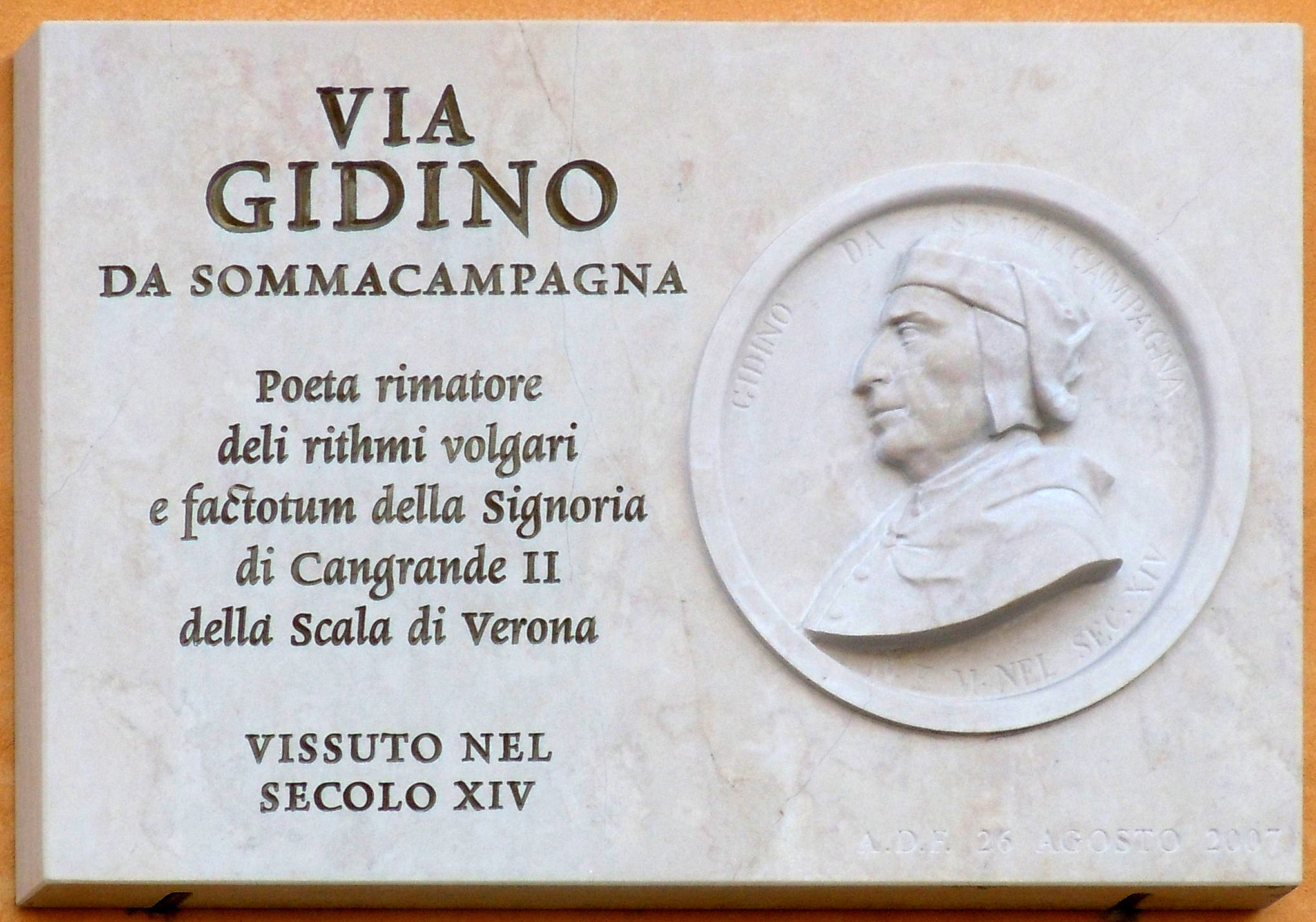
A plaque dedicated to the local poet Gidino di Sommacampagna

Sommacampagna is a town and comune in the province of Verona, Veneto, northern Italy. As of 2017, its population was 14,746.

== History ==
The town was founded during the Ancient Roman period, with the name Summa Campanea.

In the frazione of Custoza, two battles were fought during the Italian Independence Wars: the first in 1848 and the second in 1866.

== Geography ==
The municipality is part of the urban area of Verona and borders Sona, Valeggio sul Mincio, Verona and Villafranca di Verona. It counts the hamlets (frazioni) of Caselle and Custoza.

== Culture ==
The town's most famous sagra is called "Antica Fiera di Sommacampagna" and takes place every year during the last weekend of August, usually from Thursday to Tuesday.

== Transport ==
Sommacampagna is served by the A4 motorway at the homonym exit. It counts a railway station (Sommacampagna-Sona) on the Milan-Venice railway, and the Airport of Verona-Villafranca is partially located in its municipal territory, nearby Caselle.

== Sport ==
The town's main football team is Associazione Calcio Somma.

== Gallery ==
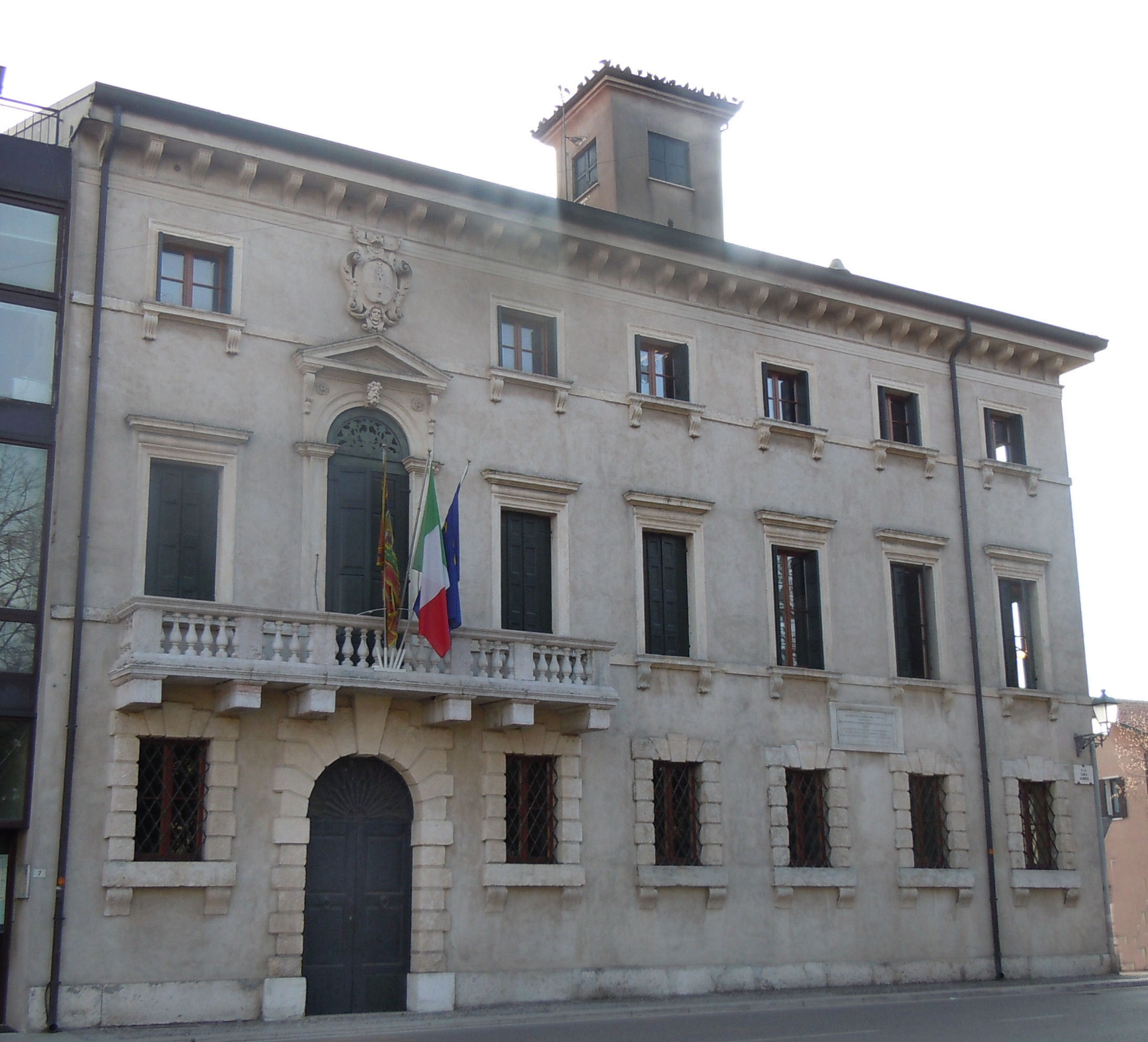
Town hall

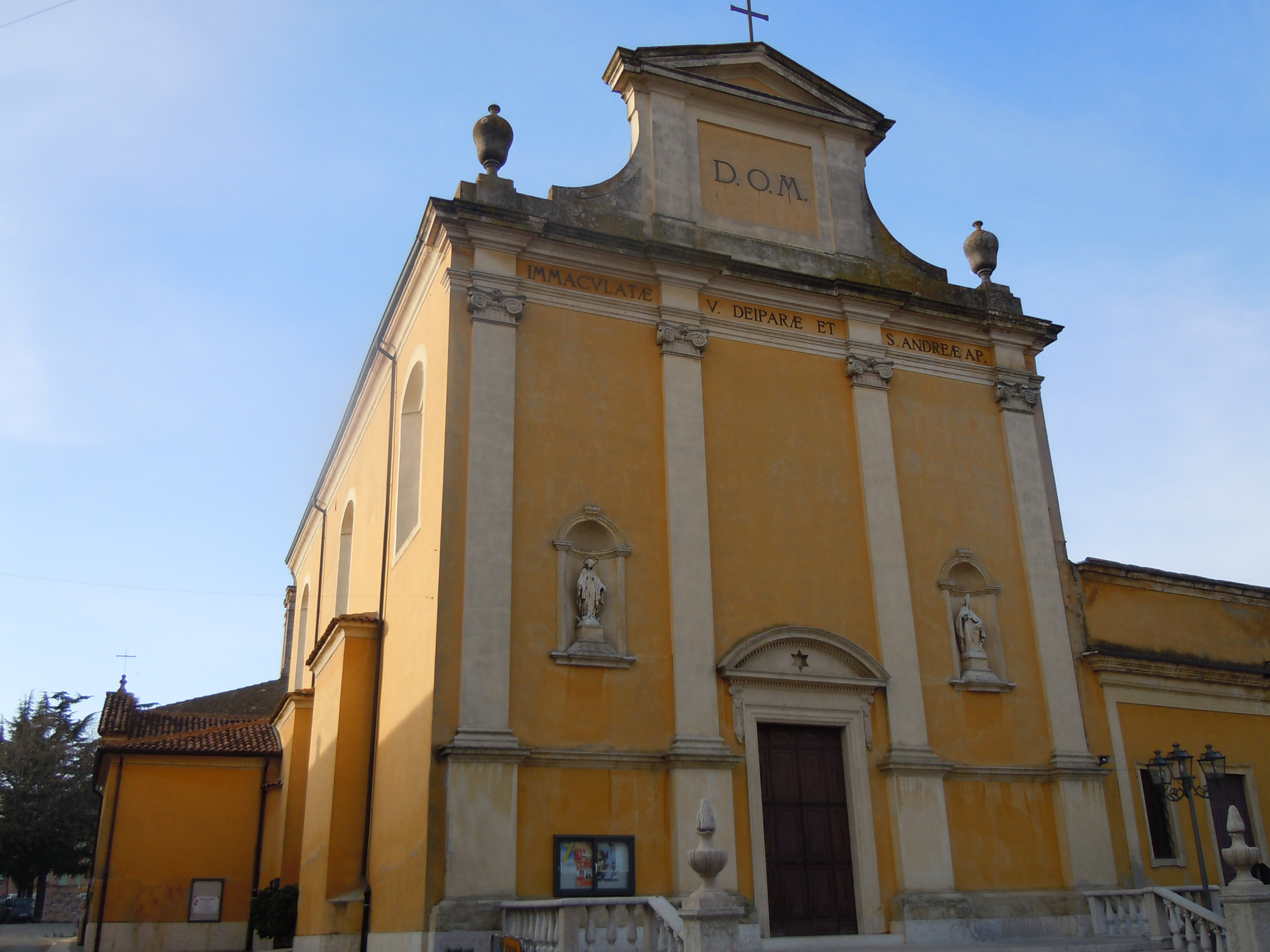
St. Andrew's Church

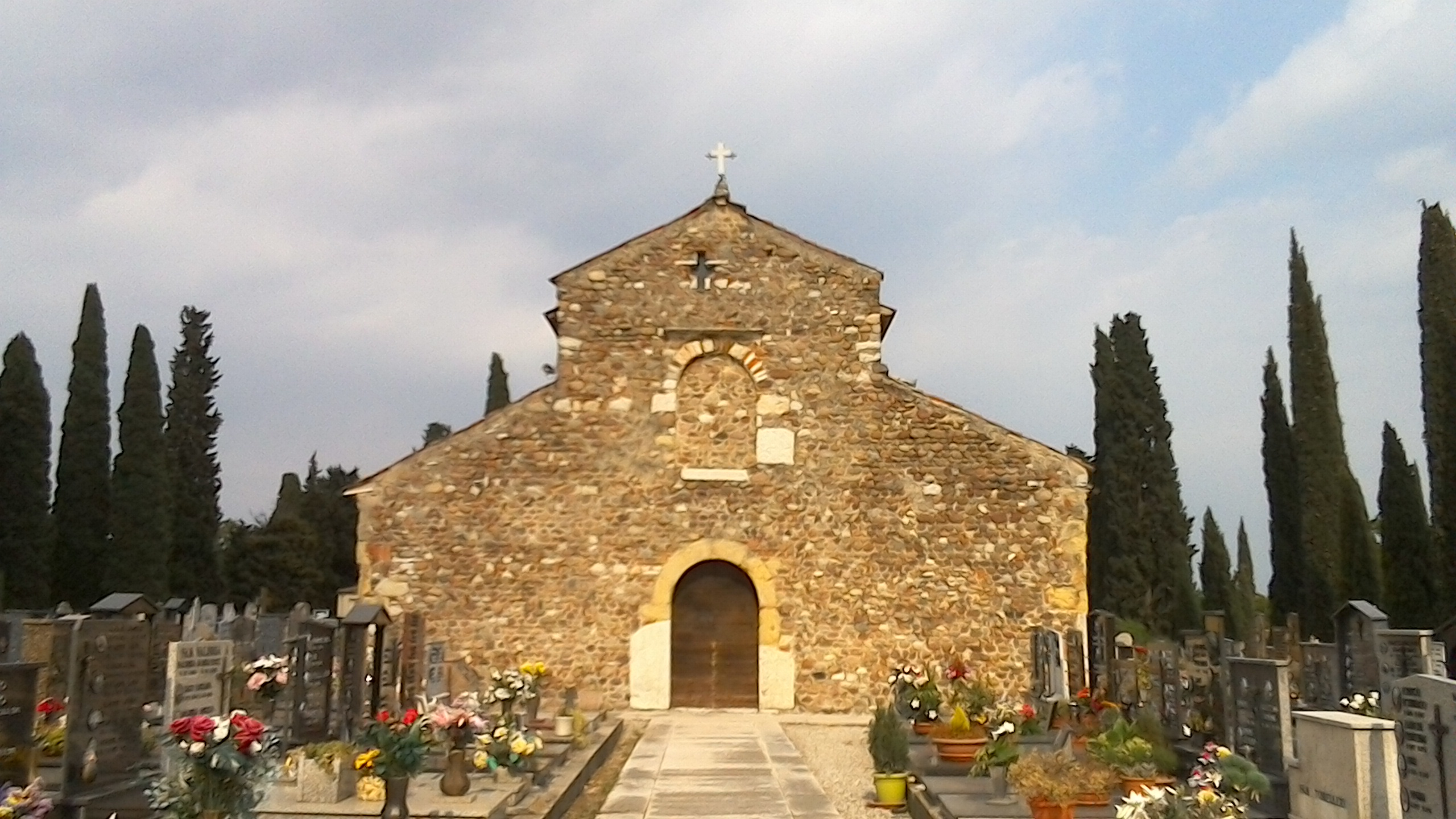
St. Andrew's Parish Church

== Notable people ==
- Federico Bricolo (b. 1966), politician

== Twin towns ==
- Hall in Tirol, Austria (since 2003)
