= Battle of Goito Bridge =

Battle of the First War of Italian Independence

- Part of First War of Italian Independence
Date	8 April 1848
Location	Goito, Lombardy, Italy 45°14′49″N 10°40′29″E
Result	Piedmontese victory

Belligerents
Kingdom of Sardinia	Austrian Empire

Commanders and leaders
Eusebio Bava; Federico d'Arvillars	Ludwig von Wohlgemuth

Strength
9,300 troops	3,000–3,500 troops

Casualties and losses
8 dead and 40 wounded	19 dead, 15 wounded and 68 captured

The Battle of Goito Bridge or Battle of the Bridge of Goito (Italian: Battaglia del Ponte di Goito) was the first significant clash fought during the First Italian War of Independence and took place on the 8th April 1848. It was so named in order to distinguish it from the far more significant and large-scale Battle of Goito that was fought the following month. The battle of Goito Bridge saw a Piedmontese division capture a key bridge on the Mincio River held by a significantly smaller Austrian detachment.

As the first battle in which the newly established Piedmontese Bersaglieri corps took part, the battle of the Bridge of Goito holds a significant place in Italian military historiography and in the corps' battle honors.

== Order of battle ==
The battle took place between an advance guard of the 1st Piedmontese division (General Eusebio Bava) commanded by Federico d'Arvillars and a smaller Austrian detachment under Ludwig von Wohlgemuth in and around the crossing on the river Mincio by Goito.

The Piedmontese advance guard consisted of a company of the newly founded light-infantry Bersaglieri, a small cavalry platoon, a detachment of military engineers, 300 marines of the Royal Sardinian Navy led by Major Alli Maccarani and a detachment of the 6th artillery battery. The Piedmontese were also reinforced by a company of Mantuan volunteers led by Captain Saverio Griffini.

A single company of skirmishing Kaiserjäger from the defending Austrian detachment had occupied the town and its outskirts, while five companies of Austrian infantry and 4 artillery pieces held the opposite bank of the river. The objective of the smaller Austrian force was to frustrate the Piedmontese crossing, delaying the enemy advance against Mantua and to destroy the bridge.

== The battle ==
Early in the morning (sometime between 8 and 9 am) the advance guard of the 1st Piedmontese Division clashed with Austrian forces outside the town. A company of Bersaglieri and a squadron of cavalry squad then attacked the company of Kaiserjäger holding the entrance to the town and "quickly forced them to disperse".

Colonel Alessandro La Marmora then led the Bersaglieri charge into the town, and was seriously injured in the jaw in the course of the engagement. The Austrians, who had earlier placed explosive on the bridge decided to blow it up in order to halt the Italian advance, but were unable to do so as the explosives had been rendered ineffective by rain the previous night.

Just as Austrian Engineers started wiring the bridge with explosives again, the Bersaglieri - supported by Major Alli Maccarani's marines - sought to capture the bridge and prevent its disabling. The Bersaglieri attack was however not full successful, and momentarily stalled under the accurate fire of the Kaiserjäger protecting the bridge-head in town. Major Alli Maccarani was wounded in the shoulder, and even the officer who replaced him was shot in the right hand and wounded. A Lieutenant from the Royal Sardinian Navy and Lieutenant Demetrio Galli of the Bersaglieri were killed alongside a number of enlisted men. The Piedmontese assault stalled.

General d'Arvillars then dispatched a few companies of the 9th infantry Regiment to aid the Bersaglieri and marines in their assault on the bridge. The Austrian engineers had however by then finished placing the explosives, and the Kaiserjäger retreated across the bridge minutes before the Austrian engineers blew up the structure. The Austrian efforts were however unsuccessful in completing destroying the key bridge: the entire floor of the bridge collapsed, but one of its parapets remained standing.

The two opposing sides then began exchanging fire across the river. Seeking to end the stalemate and to capture what remained of the crossing, General d'Arvillars ordered some Piedmontese units to march northwards and give the impression that a pontoon may be thrown across the river at another location. As the Austrian defenders prepared to retreat in order to avoid being flanked a small group of Bersaglieri and marines then climbed across the semi-destroyed bridge, prompting a collapse of the Austrian defensive position. As the Austrians fled, the Piedmontese seized a cannon and captured at least thirty prisoners.

The Austrians regrouped in Mozzecane and then retreated towards Mantua while more Piedmontese troops crossed the damaged bridge and engineers worked to restore the structure. Three hours later the bridge was supposedly fully restored, and more substantial Piedmontese forces were able to cross the bridge.
