= Custoza =

Custoza Custoxa (Venetian)
- Frazione
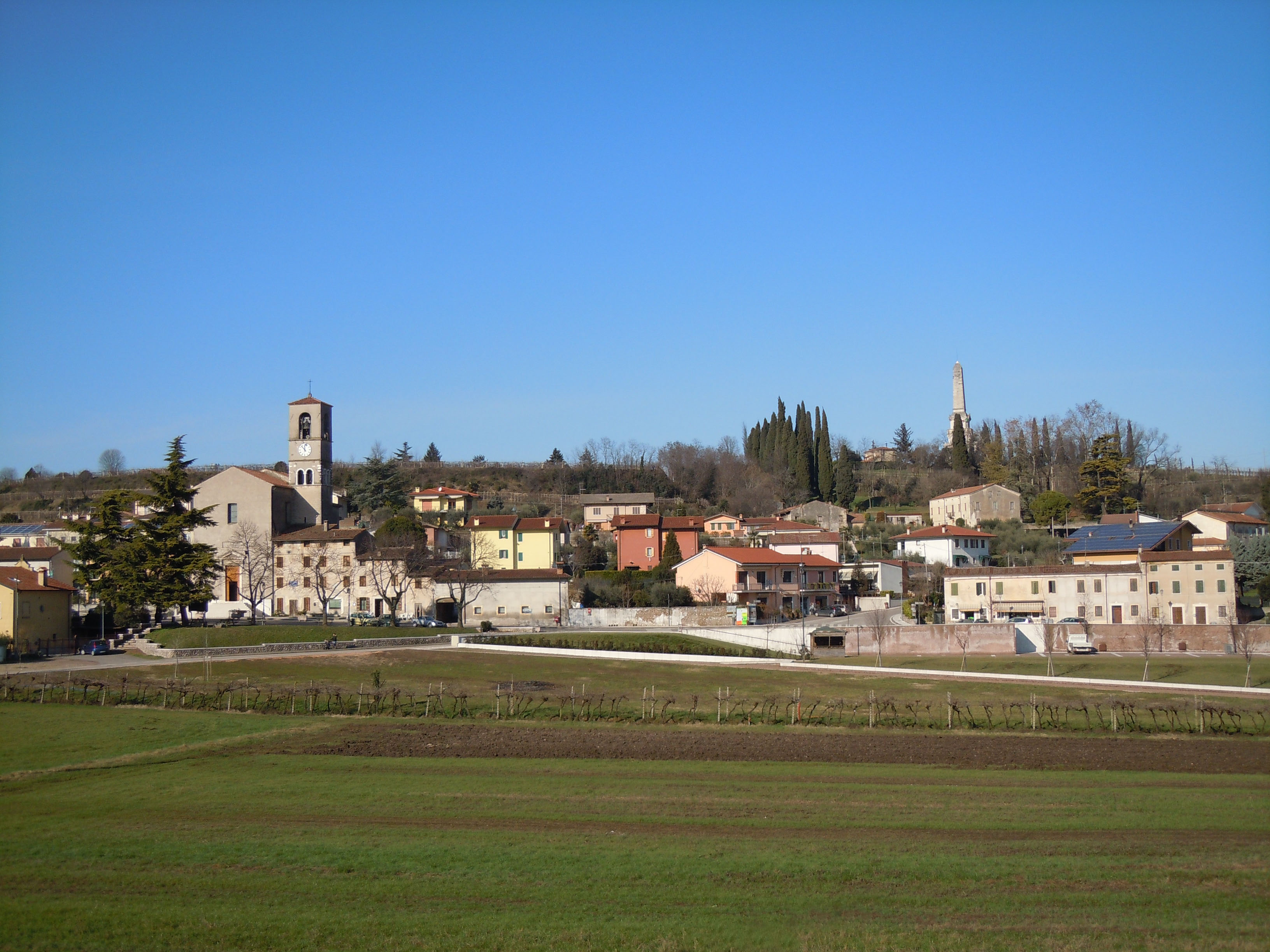
- Interactive map of Custoza
- Location of Custoza in Italy
- Coordinates: 45°22′19.0″N 10°47′36.0″E
- Country: Italy
- Region: Veneto
- Province: Verona (VR)
- Comune: Sommacampagna
- Elevation: 125 m (410 ft)

Population (2011)
  - Total: 812
- Demonym: Custozani
- Time zone: UTC+1 (CET)
  - Summer (DST): UTC+2 (CEST)
- Postal code: 37066
- Dialing code: (+39) 045
- Patron saint: St. Peter

Custoza (Italian: [kuˈstɔddza]; Venetian: Custoxa [kuˈstɔza, kuˈstoza]) is a northern Italian village and hamlet (frazione) of Sommacampagna, a municipality in the province of Verona, Veneto. As of 2011, its population was 812.

== History ==
The name of the village is derived from Latin custōdia ('protection' or 'wardenship'), since it was originally built as a watchtower over the Via Postumia. The earliest mention of Custoza is in a document dating from March 1185.

The location is famous for two battles fought during the Italian Independence Wars: the first in 1848 and the second in 1866, both against the Austrian Empire. In memory of them, the architect Giacomo Franco built the Ossuary of Custoza (Italian: Ossario di Custoza), a war grave and memorial building opened in 1879.

== Geography ==
Custoza is a rural village located in the southwestern corner of its municipality, next to Villafranca di Verona (6 km south), Valeggio sul Mincio (7 km west), and Tione dei Monti river. It is 5 km from Sommacampagna, 10 from Sona and Caselle, 12 from Verona-Villafranca Airport and 20 from Verona city centre.

The village consists of a central settlement and 3 detached, but close, quarters: Valbusa (west – 45°22′29.2″N 10°47′20.2″E), Gorgo (east – 45°22′45.5″N 10°48′17.7″E) and Bellavista (south – 45°22′19.3″N 10°47′36.7″E). Its territory includes the surrounding little localities of Bagolina, Balconi Rossi, Coronini, Marognalonga, Monte Godio, Sgaripola and Vantini.

== Main sights ==
- Ossuary of Custoza, built in 1879.
- St. Peter in Vinculis Church, built in the 18th century.
- Villa Ottolini Pignatti Murano, built in the 17th century.
- House of the Sardinian Drummer-Boy (Italian: Tamburino Sardo), historical site related to the 1848 battle.

== Gastronomy ==
The Bianco di Custoza ("Custoza White"), also known simply as "Custoza", is an Italian DOC wine produced in the countryside around the village.

== Gallery ==
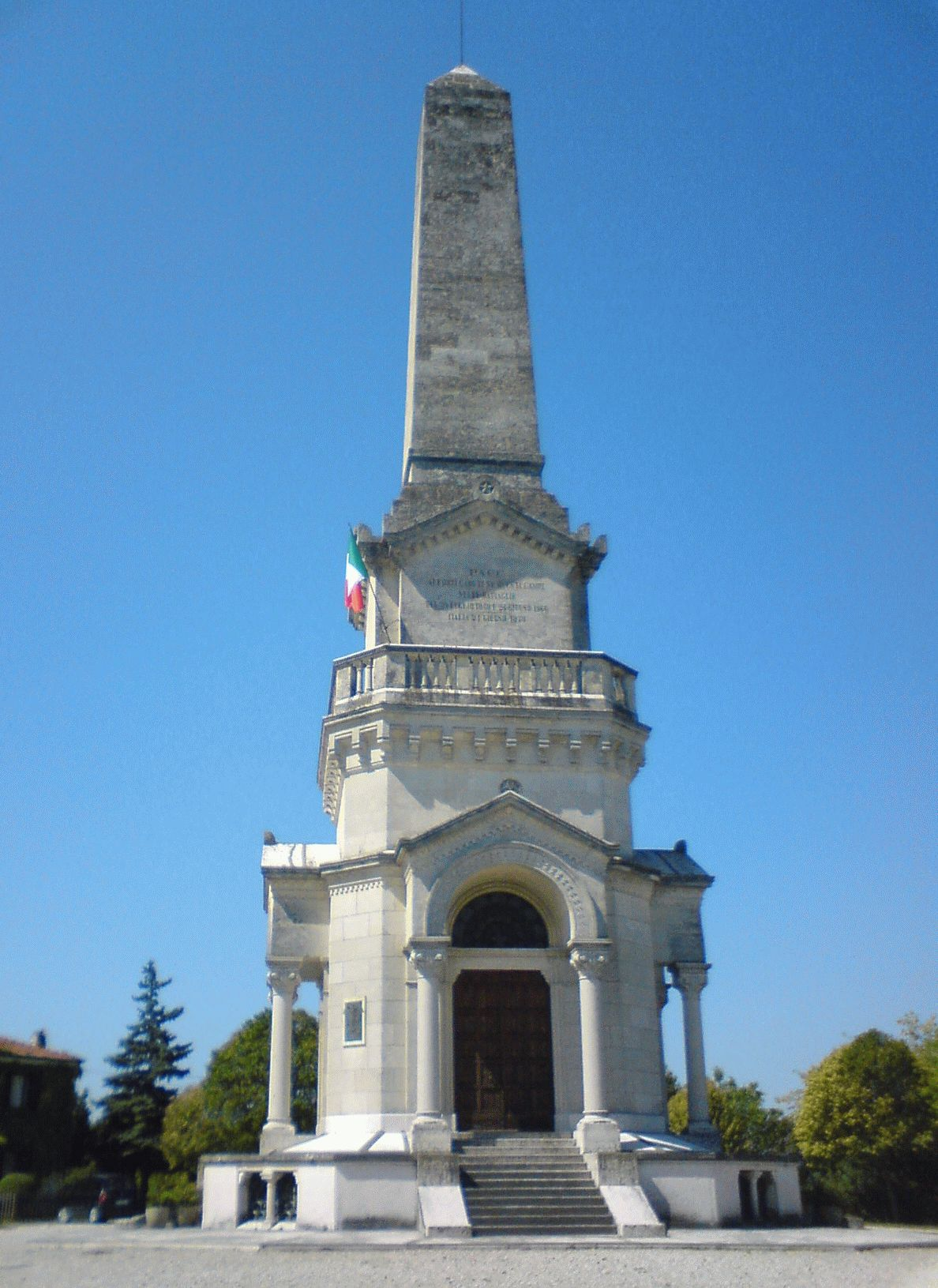
The Ossuary of Custoza

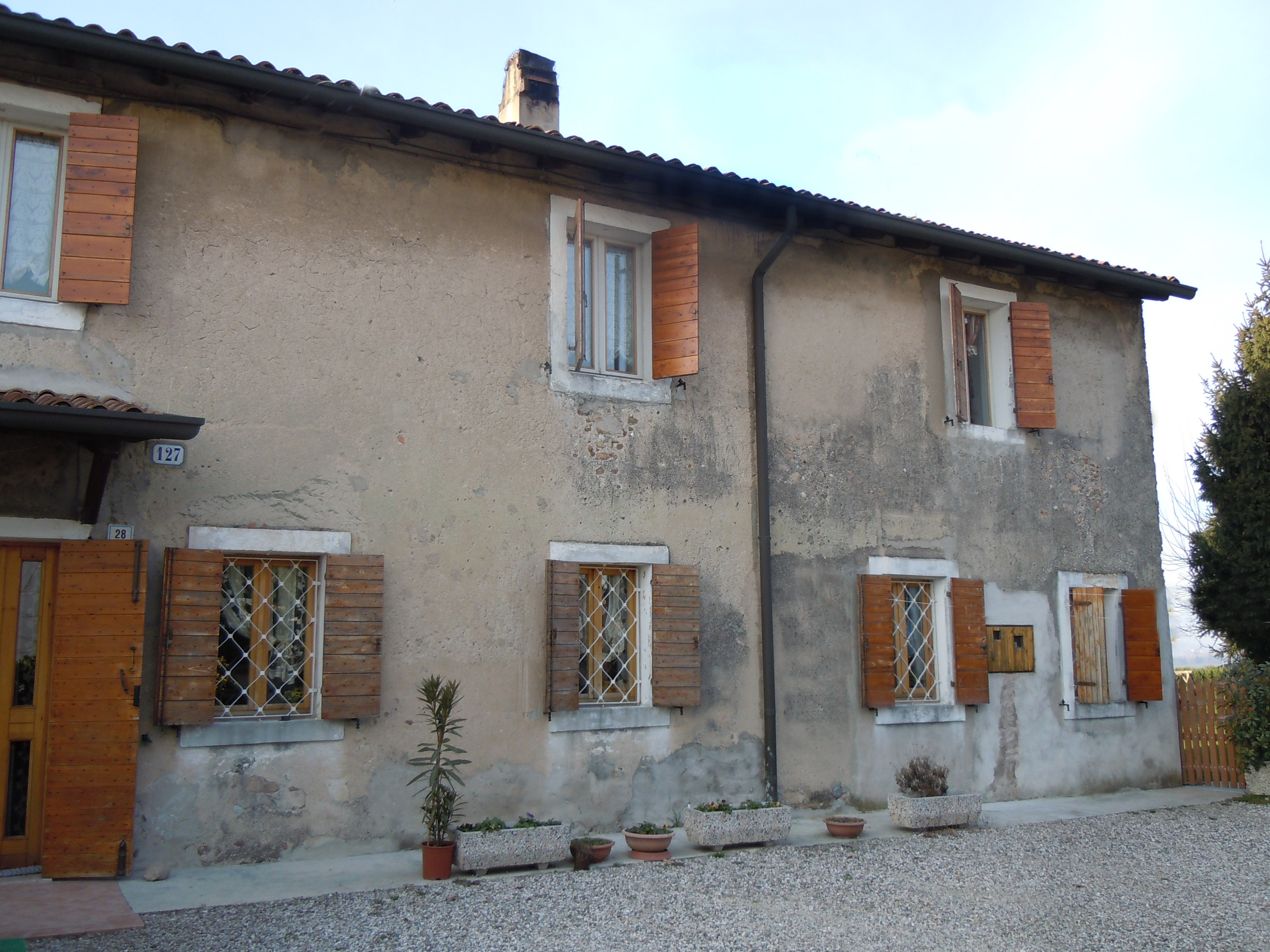
House of the Sardinian Drummer-Boy

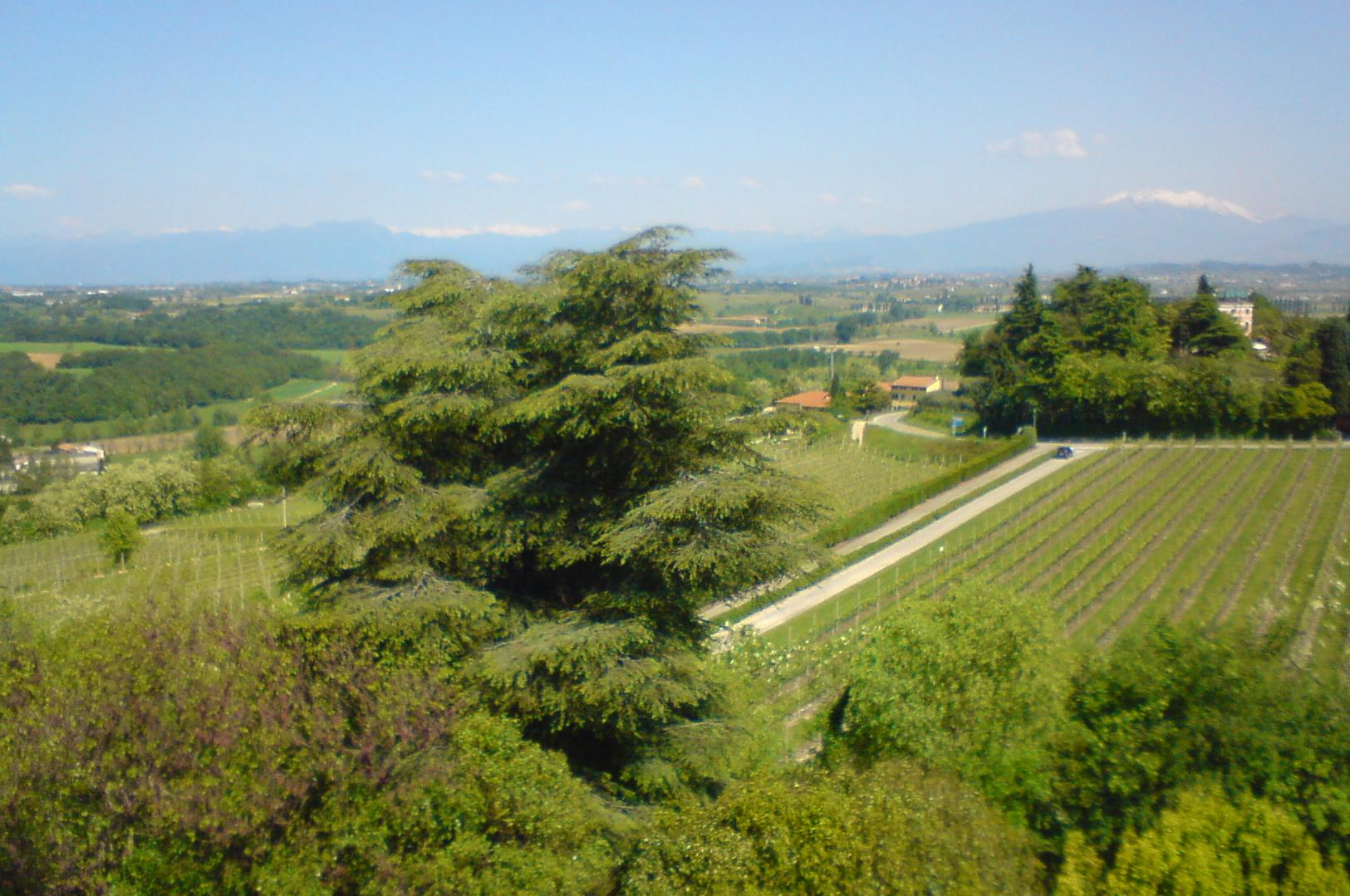
The rural area of Custoza
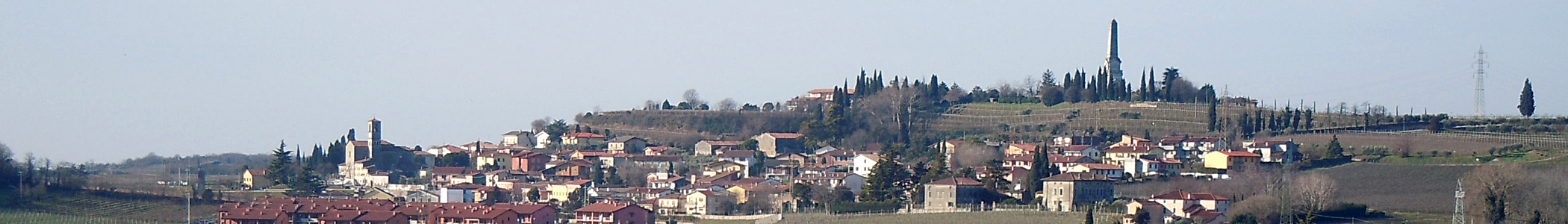
Panoramic view

== See also ==
- First Italian War of Independence
- Third Italian War of Independence
