= Villa Giraffa, Goito =

Coordinates: 45.25286°N 10.67562°E

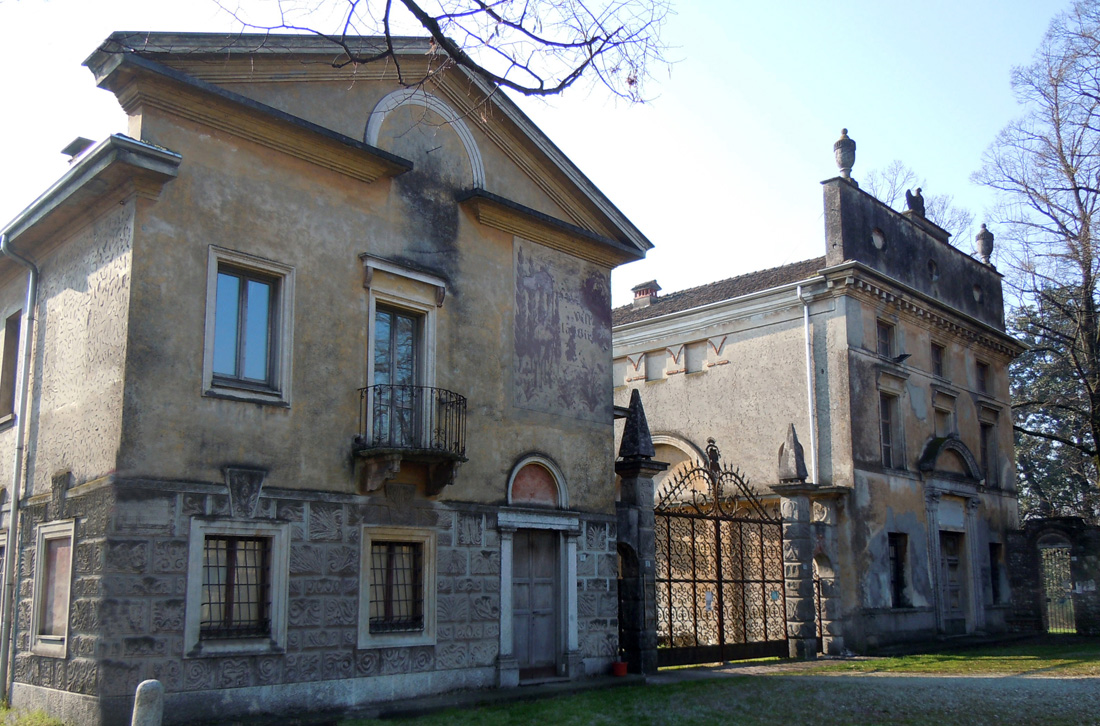
Entrance facades at Villa Giraffa

Villa Giraffa is a rural palace located on the banks of the Mincio River, near the town of Goito, province of Mantua, Lombardy, Italy. It was initially remodeled in the 15th century as a villa by the ruling Gonzaga family.

== History ==
While the villa has Renaissance-style elements, it also incorporates styles from various refurbishments over the centuries.. The villa is named after a twentieth century Giraffe statue in one of the courtyards. Isabella d'Este, wife of the Marquis Francesco II Gonzaga, donated the villa to the Capuchin order, wherein they established a monastery. The monks were expelled by the Napoleonic government, and the buildings were made into a military hospital. Later the building was used as an inn and a school. Presently the site and gardens is not in use and pending restoration.
