= Battle of Custoza =

Battle of Custoza (or Battle of Custozza) is the name of two battles fought in Custoza, near Verona, Northern Italy. Both battles were fought within the Italian unification process, and were two defeats for the Kingdom of Sardinia and later Kingdom of Italy:

- Battle of Custoza (1848)
- Battle of Custoza (1866)
