= Ludwig von Wohlgemuth =

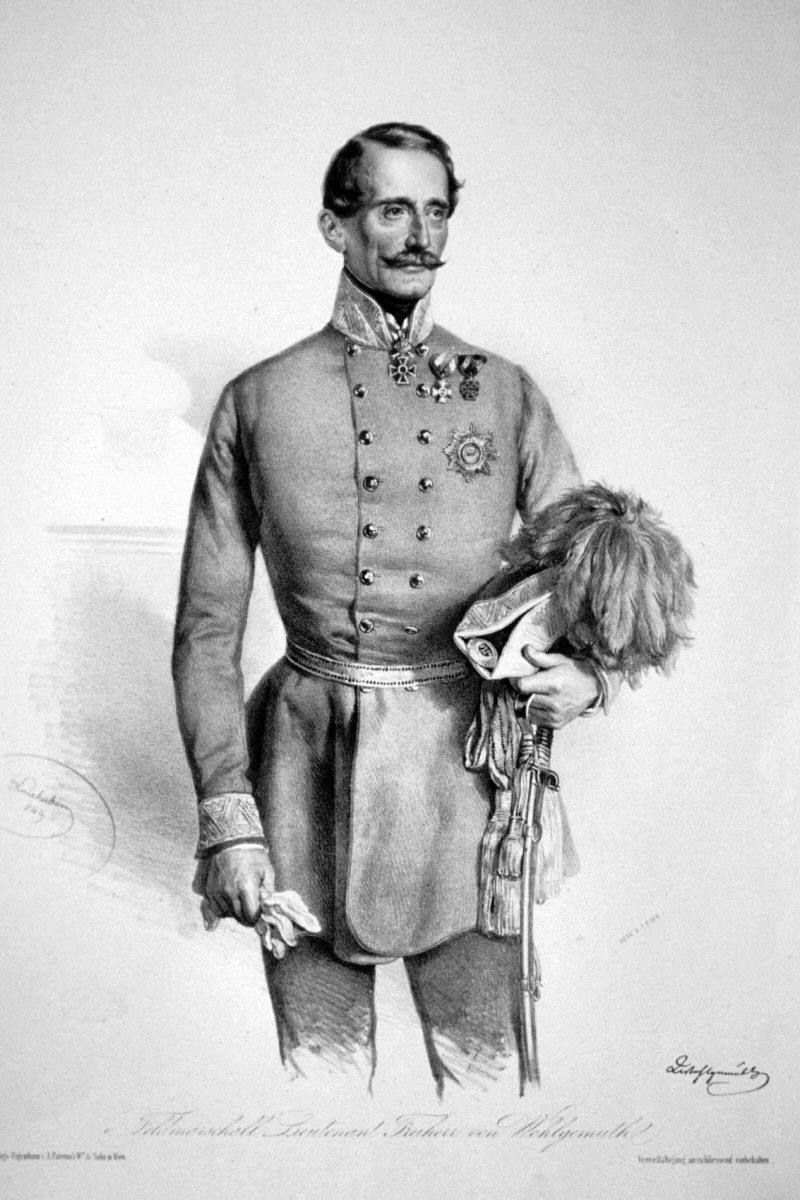
Ludwig Freiherr von Wohlgemuth

Ludwig Freiherr von Wohlgemuth (25 May 1788 – 18 April 1851) was an Austrian general and commander of the Order of Maria Theresa.

In 1844 he was appointed Major General and Brigadier of the I. Army Corps in Milan. During the revolutionary year of 1848, Wohlgemuth distinguished himself during the Five Days of Milan, and covered Radetzky's retreat. Leading the Austrian rear-guard von Wohlgemuth took defensive positions at Goito in order to slow down the Piedmontese advance. During the ensuing battle of Goito bridge forces under his command were attacked by a numerically superior Piedmontese force and failed to fully destroy a key bridge on the River Mincio or to significantly slow down the Piedmontese advance.

He died in 1851, during a trip from Budapest to Vienna.
