= Goito =

- Comune
- Comune di Goito
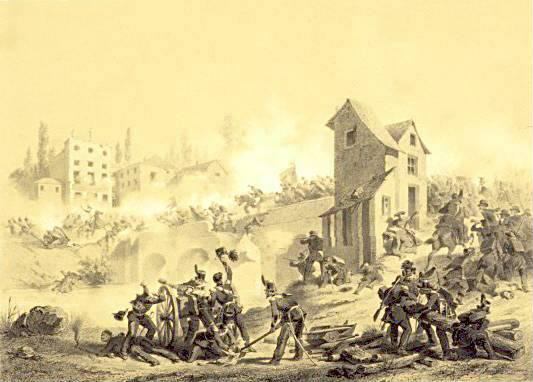
- Fight between Austrians and Piedmontese over the Mincio bridge in Goito on 8 April 1848. In the time Of Virgil, Goito was called Andes.

- Coat of arms

- Location within Italy Location within Lombardy
- Coordinates: 45°15′N 10°40′E
- Country: Italy
- Region: Lombardy
- Province: Mantua (MN)
- Frazioni: Cerlongo, Solarolo, Marsiletti, Torre, Sacca, Calliero, Vasto, Massimbona, Belvedere, Ca'Vecchia Gobbi, Maglia, Sagrada 1, Borgo Diciotto, Ca' Vagliani, Cascina Palazzetto, Catapane, Aquilone, Terra Nera, Isola, Tezze Vasto, Ronziolo, Barattere, Villabona, Baronina, Loghino, Corte Bellacqua di Sotto, Corte Grandi, Corte Quaresima Vecchia, Sagrada II, Valle Buratto, Cascina Bondi, Corte Bellacqua di Sopra, San Lorenzo, Corte Merlesco, Corte Resenasco

Government
  - Mayor: Pietro Chiaventi

Area
  - Total: 79.22 km^{2} (30.59 sq mi)
- Elevation: 33 m (108 ft)

Population (31 August 2017)
  - Total: 10,289
  - Density: 129.9/km^{2} (336.4/sq mi)
- Demonym: Goitesi
- Time zone: UTC+1 (CET)
  - Summer (DST): UTC+2 (CEST)
- Postal code: 46044
- Dialing code: 0376
- Patron saint: St. Peter and Paul
- Saint day: June 29
- Website: Official website

Goito (Upper Mantovano: Gùit) is a comune with a population of 10,005 in the Province of Mantua in Lombardy. Goito is 20 kilometres (12 mi) north of Mantua on the road leading to Brescia and Lake Garda, and straddles the old east–west Via Postumia between Cremona and Verona. The town is on the right bank of the Mincio River at a key crossing. The birthplace of Sordello, Goito is part of the historic region known as Alto Mantovano (Upper Mantua) and was the site of a notable fortress.

== Etymology ==
Goito generally indicates an area of Gothic settlement, and is a common toponym in Italy; a similar example is godega. In 1902, Italian legal scholar Nino Tamassia published a document from 1045 which was brought to his attention by scholar F. C. Carreri and indicated that at least some of Goito's inhabitants said that they still lived "according to Gothic law" ("qui professimus legem vivere Gothorum"). Local histories by Federico Amedei, Livio Calafassi and Giovanni Tassoni have agreed on the toponym's Gothic origin. Historian Pietro Pelati, however, said that the name drives from guttus (a Latin term for a water vase, often indicating a settlement by a river).

== History ==
=== Antiquity ===
In pre-Roman antiquity, present-day Goito stood at a crossing of the river Mincio halfway between the Celtic Cenomani towns of Brescia and Verona and the Etruscan and Boii settlement of Mantua. The Cenomani tribe soon became Roman clients, but goodwill between them and the expanding Roman Republic did not last. Eventually, allied with the Insubres and Boii, they participated in a series of revolts between 200 and 197 BCE orchestrated and aided by a Carthaginian general named Hamilcar; modern historians, however, call Hamilcar's role "minimal". The Cenomani and Insubres were defeated at an unspecified crossing of the Mincio in 197 BCE by the Roman consul Gaius Cornelius Cethegus; during the battle, the Cenomani may have betrayed the Insubres. Roman rule of the upper Mantua began.

Goito may have been founded as a Roman way station in the early second century BCE when the Romans built the Via Postumia, a major road connecting their colonies at Genoa, Piacenza and Cremona in Aemilia et Liguria to the newly conquered territories in the eastern Po Valley. The middle section of the Postumia began in Cremona and ran eastwards to Bedriacum (the main crossing of the river Oglio), crossing the Mincio at Goito (other nearby crossings were at Valeggio and Mantua) before continuing east to the former Cenomani town of Verona and the capital of the new Roman province of Venetia at Aquileja.

Portions of the Via Postumia have always been visible in Goito: on the right bank of the Mincio at Corte Merlesca and Torre di Goito, and on the left bank at Massimbona. These sections of the road are locally known as la Levada ("the raised road"). Further evidence of Roman-era settlement in the area is Roman remains found in the late 19th century at Castelvetere – or Castelvetro – indicating a settlement (now at the Museo Civico at Mantua) and 21 Roman burials excavated in 1939 about 1.5 kilometres (0.93 mi) south-east of the town. A number of brooches (fibulae), a carved cameo jewel, pendants, and portions of a glass-bead necklace were found in the tombs. No Roman-era bridge has been found on the Mincio, so the river was probably crossed by ferry or at a ford. Local historians have taken the toponym Corte Guá (farmstead at the ford) to indicate an old ford on the Mincio.

=== Early Middle Ages ===
After the fall of Rome, Goito became a significant barbarian settlement. Excavations in 1968 and from 1990 to 1993 unearthed two late antiquity and early medieval burial grounds on the road between Goito and Castellucchio, at Sacca di Goito, with at least 240 burials. Two small cross pendants, a number of short swords and daggers, pendants and other objects were retrieved. Some of the graves probably belonged to Ostrogoths (fibulae and mirrors are attributed to the Chernyakhov culture), but most of the burials were Lombards.

=== High Middle Ages ===
Documents from 11th-century Goito indicate that its population lived according to Latin, Lombard and Gothic law. Carreri said that the first mention of the town was a small donation in 1031 by a priest of "Latin law" named Martin, son of Leo, to the monastery of Saint Genesius in Brescello. Two similar donations were made to the Church of Saint Mary (a dependency of the monastery) by Manfred "of Alemannian law" in 1042 and 1044. Matilda of Tuscany, countess of Mantua, donated four farmsteads in nearby Rivalta sul Mincio and four in Goito to the monastery in 1099.

Eighteenth-century historian Ippolito Donesmondi published a document that the rights to a chapel in the Goito castle were donated in 1123 by the bishop of Mantua to the abbey of San Benedetto Polirone (a wealthy monastery patronized by Matilda of Tuscany), indicating that Goito was already fortified. Goito's connections to Matilda have led local historians (including Carreri) to theorize that the 1080 battle of Volta Mantovana between imperial and papal forces actually took place in Goito rather than nearby Volta, but their interpretation would rest on a different understanding of the text of Bernold of Constance's Chronicon (substituting "apud Guithum" for the accepted "apud Voltam").

The castle of Goito became more significant. Frederick II received a delegation from Mantua at Goito in 1237, and pardoned the Mantuans for their insubordination against the Holy Roman Empire. In 1250, the castle was chosen for an Imperial Diet by Conrad IV of Germany.

According to his near-contemporary anonymous Occitan biographer, the troubadour Sordello was born into a knightly family in Goito during the late 12th century. Early modern Mantuan historians such as Bartolomeo Sacchi "il Platina" and Scipione Agnelli Maffei said that he was from the Mantuan line of the Visconti family (a claim not accepted by modern historians), and literary historian Giovanni Mario Crescimbeni said that Sordello, after his exile in Provence, returned and acquired the title "de Goito" when he became lord of Goito. This claim is unsubstantiated, and not accepted by modern historians; the elderly Sordello returned to Italy as a member of Charles of Anjou's entourage in 1265. He was imprisoned at Novara for unknown reasons the following year, and received the lordship of lands and castles in Abruzzo in 1269.

According to historians, the Bonacolsi family (de facto rulers of Mantua) purchased a house to collect tolls at the bridge in Goito during the late 13th century. The Bonacolsis' enemy and the new ruler of Mantua, Gian Francesco Gonzaga, granted Goito a tax exemption in 1318. Charles IV of Bohemia donated the town to the house of Gonzaga and the Marquisate of Mantua in 1353; this confirmed Goito's status as a fortress for the Gonzagas, a significant signoria in the late medieval Po Valley.

=== The Renaissance ===
During the 15th century, Goito was involved in the wars opposing the Visconti of Milan to the rising Gonzaga of Mantua and the Republic of Venice. In 1453, Carlo Gonzaga (a claimant to the Gonzaga estates in Mantua) attempted to take control of the area with Venetian support; Gonzaga's troops were defeated at the farmstead of Villabona (a frazione of Goito) on 14 June by the forces of marquis of Mantova Ludovico III Gonzaga. Ludovico Gonzaga, pleased with the victory, built a residence in Goito (where painter Andrea Mantegna worked in 1463–64), restored the fortifications and built the Naviglio di Goito canal; he died there from plague in 1478. Goito maintained its prosperity under dukes of Mantua Guglielmo and Vincenzo I Gonzaga, becoming a wealthy market town on the road between Mantua and Venetian-held Verona.

=== War of the Mantuan Succession ===
On 22 November 1629, during the War of the Mantuan Succession Goito was surrendered by its Mantuan commander to imperial forces who were besieging Mantua. Goito's capture was a key episode of the siege; its fall threatened communication and supply routes with Peschiera and Valeggio sul Mincio, its Venetian allies in Verona. An attempt to lift the siege failed on 29 May 1630, when French and Venetian troops were defeated outside Goito at the Battle of Villabuona in the present-day frazione of Villabona. The treaty of Cherasco restored Goito and the duchy of Mantua to Charles Gonzaga, duke of Mantua. The war, its ensuing plague, and the general decline in Mantua's economic and political fortunes began Goito's decline. The town was struck by an earthquake on 5 July 1693, and its castle was damaged.

=== 18th century ===
In the autumn of 1701, during the War of the Spanish Succession, Goito was besieged by imperial troops; it was relieved by French troops allied with Duke of Mantua Ferdinando Carlo Gonzaga the following spring, and was unsuccessfully besieged by another imperial army on 19 May 1702. The French garrison at Goito was driven out of the town on 19 August 1706 by imperial forces commanded by the prince of Hesse. In his report of the battle, the prince wrote that Goito had "a large ditch, a thick wall, 4 bastions and a ravelin" and he besieged it with 1,800 foot soldiers and 1,000 cavalry. After an unsuccessful eight-gun bombardment, the prince gave orders to scale the walls; the commander surrendered the night before, however, and was allowed to withdraw with his 200-man garrison to Cremona. The seizure of Goito was a key event in the lead-up to the French victory in the battle of Castiglione, where the imperial forces were defeated by a large French army which arrived too late to save Goito. Despite that defeat, imperial forces conquered Lombardy for Austria; they entered Milan on 26 September 1706, ending a century and a half of Spanish rule in Lombardy.

Duke Ferdinando Carlo Gonzaga's alliance with France and betrayal of his emperor during the war was punished by an imperial edict ending his lordship of the Duchy of Mantua. He died in exile in Padua before the news reached him, and the duchy and Goito were incorporated by the Austrian Circle. Spanish Lombardy also became an Austrian domain, administered separately from the former duchy of Mantua. Austrian gains in Lombardy and Mantua were confirmed by the Treaty of Utrecht.

During the War of the Polish Succession, a Franco-Piedmontese army invaded Austrian Lombardy and entered the duchy of Mantua. Imperial troops led by Count Königsegg had left a garrison of 100 men under Lieutenant Carrillo at Goito to prevent the allies from crossing the Mincio or slow their advance. Fearing that the allied army had crossed further upstream, Carillo left Goito on 16 June 1735 after destroying (partially or completely) its Mincio bridge; the town was then occupied by a 400-man force commanded by the Comte de Ségur. The main Austrian army and the Piedmontese-French allies faced off from opposite sides of the Mincio and count Königsegg, fearing that his position was no longer defensible, retreated from Lombardy. After their October 1735 armistice negotiations, the French were allowed to keep a garrison in Goito and free passage to supply it; the garrison was removed when the peace was concluded.

In 1745, during the War of the Austrian Succession, the Austrian administration wanted to simplify governance and finance and united the former Duchy of Mantua (including Goito) with Austrian Lombardy and the former Duchy of Milan; Goito has been a comune of Lombardy ever since. Taxes to fund the war being fought across Germany and in western Lombardy, Piedmont and Liguria were raised, and soldiers from the Mantuan countryside were recruited to fight in Austrian regiments. Historian Corrado Vivanti wrote that peasants and townsmen in declining Goito benefited little after the wars from the judicial, administrative and revenue reforms associated with Maria Theresa of Austria and Joseph II of Austria's enlightened absolutism and the reformism of Lombard intellectuals (which consolidated large-scale landholding), and the region experienced agrarian disturbances in 1761.

=== Napoleonic Wars ===
In 1796, during operations leading to the Battle of Borghetto, Goito was taken by French revolutionary troops and incorporated into the Cisalpine Republic; it was recaptured by Sebastian Prodanovich, an Austrian colonel of Serbian descent, on 11 April 1799. On 25–26 December 1800, French troops trying to recapture the town in connection with the Battle of Pozzolo clashed again with the Austrians at the Goito bridge. In the initial engagements by the French right flank, General Dupont and the Division Watrin defeated an 8,000-man Austrian force led by General D'Aspré and seized the town and bridge. The battle involving the French right flank then shifted to nearby Monzambano. After French victories in the Italian Campaign, Goito and Lombardy became part of the Napoleonic Kingdom of Italy. On 8 February 1814, during the War of the Sixth Coalition, 34,000 French and Italian troops led by Eugène de Beauharnais and a similar number of Austrians under Field Marshal Heinrich von Bellegarde battled for control of Goito, its bridge, and the surrounding area in the Battle of the Mincio River.

=== Unification of Italy (1815–1861) ===
After the Napoleonic Wars, Goito and the Mantuan territories were returned to the Austrian crown and incorporated into the Kingdom of Lombardy–Venetia. The Piedmontese army won the Battle of Goito Bridge, the opening engagement of the First Italian War of Independence, on 8 April 1848 in the first military engagement of the Bersaglieri light infantry. In a brief battle, the new light-infantry unit commanded by Alessandro La Marmora captured the bridge and forced the small detachment of Austrian defenders to withdraw to the Austrian Quadrilatero fortress. After Radetzsky's counter-offensive in May and the defeat of Tuscan and Neapolitan volunteers at the Battle of Curtatone and Montanara, the Austrian and Piedmontese armies clashed again on 30 May 1848 in the Battle of Goito; Radetzky was defeated, and the Piedmontese army resumed its offensive.

With the final defeat of the Piedmontese army at Custoza and the end of the war, Goito returned to Austrian rule. As part of the nationalist Risorgimento movement, Goito residents continued to conspire against Austrian rule (risking arrest and execution). The most notable case in the province of Mantua was the January 1852 arrest and execution of an underground nationalist circle founded by the priest Enrico Tazzoli, who had attended the Goito grammar school. Tazzoli and his followers, who became known as the Belfiore martyrs, were integral to the development of Italian nationalism. Don Giuseppe Ottonelli, a Goito native and the pastor of San Silvestro church, was also tried and sentenced to death. He escaped execution; his sentence was commuted by Radetzky, and he was later pardoned.

=== Italy-Austria border crossing (1861–1866) ===
Goito became part of the Kingdom of Sardinia in 1859 (which became known as the Kingdom of Italy in 1861) after the Second Italian War of Independence, and was annexed by the new province of Brescia. Three-fifths of the former province of Mantua (including Mantua) remained in Austrian territory. As a result of the partition of the former province between Italy and Austria, Goito was briefly an international border crossing between the kingdom of Italy on one side of the Mincio and Austria-Hungary on the other. Because the Treaty of Zürich stipulated that the Mincio was the border between Italian Lombardy and Austrian Mantua, the town was divided; one-third of its residents (1,050) now lived in Austria, and two-thirds lived in the main Italian town. Crossing the border for everyday business was complicated, although the Goitesi were exempt from passport requirements; according to Italian police reports, a local schoolteacher tried to elude border patrols for nightly meetings with an Austrian police inspector in Austrian-held Villa Giraffa. Austrian authorities, convinced that Goito priest Don Giuseppe Rondelli and Pietro Fortuna (a political refugee from Austrian-held Venetia) incited Italian nationalism, tried to prevent left-bank residents from crossing the river to listen to nationalist sermons at mass. Rondelli wrote and published an 1860 book, Sulle sventure di Mantova, Verona, Venezia lotto il gioco dell'Austria (On the Misfortunes of Mantua, Verona and Venice Under the Austrian Yoke), saying that one-third of his flock remained "under Austrian tyranny" and complaining of the "persecution suffered at every crossing of the bridge for being of one true colour, that of a true Italian". The international border crossing ended with the Italian annexation of Venetia after the Third Italian War of Independence.

=== Liberal Italy (1866-1919) ===
Political and social life in Goito and Upper Mantua was influenced by the agrarian struggles which culminated in the 1883 and 1885 tenant and farm-labourer strikes known as "Le Boje". The strikes began in the Lower Mantuan municipality of Gonzaga, involved a number of adjoining villages, and are recognized as Italy's first mass labour strike. Labourers and tenants formed two cooperative associations to negotiate better wages from local landlords during the late 19th century: La Cooperativa in Goito in 1873, and a second in Cerlongo in 1893.

=== Fascism (1919–1943) ===
Goito and Upper Mantua experienced political and social unrest during the Biennio Rosso as left-wing activists and agricultural workers tried to wrest local political power from middle-class townspeople; landlords and other influential rural people formed the Confederazione Nazionale Agraria and, on 3 May 1921, a local chapter of the new National Fascist Party (Partito Nazionale Fascista, or PNF). Goito agricultural landowner Giuseppe "Pino" Moschini was the major Fascist squadrismo organizer in Goito and the surrounding area. Moschini's activism crushed peasant agitation, ending widespread rent strikes and curtailing regional left-wing political activism. Violence such as a three-day raid on Valeggio sul Mincio ensured that Moschini, the local "Ras", became one of the most prominent Fascist leaders in rural Mantua; between 1922 and 1927 he "single-handedly controlled economic policy and all labour movement in the entire province". Moschini also participated in Fascist expeditions against leftists in Parma, Cremona, Bolzano, Milano and Ferrara, and his description of some of the raids were collected by posthumous admirers in a 1934 book. Mantuan PNF newspaper La Voce di Mantova described him as a "the young-faced, red-bearded leader (...) who has chosen over considerable wealth this hard life of battle, revealing uncommon organizational capacity. Rough-tempered, with the character of a former officer of the Alpini, he is invariably forgiven his tremendous ragings by his subordinates who know the extent of his goodness and are deeply attached to him".

Internal PNF struggles and rivalry with more "moderate" Fascist leaders (such as the mayor of Mantua) diminished Moschini's role. His support of corporatism and his dislike for those he considered opportunistic fascists with no true conviction led Moschini to criticize some of Italy's leading industrialists, such as Agnelli and Adriano Olivetti, and he challenged Olivetti to a duel. Marginalized nationally by his radicalism, Moschini was removed from the provincial PNF secretariat in a local 1927 reorganization led by Augusto Turati. Moschini remained locally influential, founding the Mantuan legion of Blackshirts (the XXIII "Mincio" Legion) and organizing the construction of a monument to the Bersaglieri to which Benito Mussolini contributed 1,000 lire. He died in a 1934 car crash, and was buried in the family villa in Goito. Local authorities named the town's new kindergarten in his honor and organized the Trofeo Moschini, an annual bicycle race between Mantua and Milan.

=== World War II and resistance ===
During World War II, in the wake of the Armistice of Cassibile, German occupation of Northern Italy and creation of the fascist Italian Social Republic puppet state in nearby Salò, a few residents of the provinces of Mantua and Verona joined local partisan formations to fight the Germans; others signed up with local collaborationist units. Goito, a rural market town, was apparently significant to the Germans only as an entrepôt for trucks carrying supplies to the Gothic Line. Its skies saw some air combat, however, as Allied air forces disrupted German supply lines and truck stops between Verona and the Gothic Line and bombed industrial centres in German-occupied northern Italy.

On 2 April 1945 air combat over Goito, Aeronautica Nazionale Repubblicana pilot and Bologna fascist leader Aristide Sarti's Messerschmitt Bf 109 was shot down by a USAF P-47 Thunderbolt from the 346th Fighter Squadron piloted by Lt. Richard Sulzbach and crashed in a pond in the rural frazione of Corte Baronina. Sarti died in the crash or drowned in the pond. The dogfight began when National Republican Air Force Bf 109s from the 2nd "Gigi Tre Osei" fighter group attacked a group of 57th Bombardment Wing B-25s and their P-47 escorts from the 346th and 347th fighter squadrons returning from a bombing run. The engagement was one of the ANR's most catastrophic air battles; with no kills, 14 of the fighter group's Bf 109s were shot down and six of its pilots were killed.

Nine days later, USAF planes bombed Goito for over two hours and damaged a number of homes; there were no fatalities. Goito was not the objective of the raid, which targeted a large, partially-concealed German fuel depot. Seven Flying Fortresses from the 483rd Bomber Group, escorted by 36 Mustangs from the 52nd Fighter Group, first attacked the depot but did little damage; a Luftwaffe Arado 234 was damaged by the escorts, however, and crash-landed in Switzerland. The second wave of 24 Liberators from the 464th and 465th Bomber Groups hit portions of the fuel depot, and a third wave of 36 Liberators from the 454th, 455th and 456th Bomber Groups reportedly destroyed 12 structures at the Goito fuel depot.

The most prominent resistance unit in the upper Mantuan countryside was the Brigata Italia, based in nearby Villafranca di Verona and responsible for operations in and around Goito. On 25 April 1945, captured resistance fighter Barbieri Gino was executed by retreating German soldiers in Goito and his body left unburied on the road. The town was liberated by the Allies the following day.

=== First Republic (1948–1994) ===
After the war, Goito benefited from the Italian economic miracle and rising standards of living. New consumer goods, educational institutions and amenities transformed life, and a cinema opened on the Sala Verde in 1948.

The population (primarily agricultural labourers and organized in the Federbraccianti trade union) began supporting the Italian Communist Party, transforming the town into a left-wing stronghold. The 1949 national strike of agricultural labourers was especially significant, with several farmhouses dynamited; fourteen left-wing activists, including local labour secretary Angelo Vincenzi, were arrested for criminal conspiracy, illegal possession of firearms and criminal damage. The charges against Vincenzi and six others were dropped for lack of evidence in 1952, and seven others were imprisoned.

Communist trade unionist Gina Magnoni was elected mayor of Goito in the 1949 municipal elections, the first woman to win a mayoral election in Mantua province. Local Communist leader Narciso Vaccari won municipal elections in 1951 and 1956. Authorities in newly-democratic Italy were still often unsympathetic to labour unrest and political activism; on 27 July 1954, the provincial prefect suspended Vaccari for three months after he gave political speeches and encouraged farm workers to join the 15 June 1954 national farmhands' strike. Goito's team won the 1959 national championship in tamburello, a racket-type sport primarily played in Lombardy and Piedmont.

The Communist Party's influence then declined. It was defeated in the 1960 local elections, when Goito elected Christian Democracy's Aldo Pampuri mayor. The party narrowly won municipal elections again with Sereno Guindolini on 22 November 1964. A Christian Democratic majority in the municipal council was again won in the municipal elections of 7 June 1970. Elections in 1975 and 1980 chose Partito Socialista Italiano candidate (and former Christian Democrat ward councillor) Rinaldo Rabbi to form coalitions: first with the Communists, and then with the Christian Democrats. Rabbi was controversial locally; he was dropped from the Socialist Party mayoral candidacy after internal party disagreements, but remained active in local politics as an alderman. In 1985, a fragile coalition led by Christian Democrat Cesarino Marchioro governed Goito until it was dissolved in 1987. During the 28 May 1989 elections, Communist leader Giancarlo Pajetta reportedly gave one of his last political speeches.

In the autumn of 1989, Rabbi (then an alderman) was arrested and charged with arms trafficking; he had sold submachine guns manufactured by a Goito gunsmith to criminals in the Mantova and Verona areas and possibly to the Mafia. When Democratic Socialist former deputy mayor and planning committee chair Arnaldo Vincenzi was sentenced to 22 months' imprisonment for extortion and abuse of public office, the national daily Corriere della Sera asked if Goito deserved "the prize for being the region's most turbulent municipality". Rabbi was later imprisoned in Brescia's Canton Mombello for pedophilia before his sentence was reduced to house arrest.

=== Second Republic (1994–present) ===
During the early 1990s, the mani pulite (clean hands) investigation ended the First Republic and many political parties. Former Communist leader Enzo Cartapati was elected mayor of Goito in 1991 for the new Democratic Party of the Left, and was re-elected for the Democrats of the Left in 1994. The Lega Lombarda party attracted considerable support in Mantua province and Goito during the late 1990s, and in 1998 former Christian Democrat Pietro Marcazzan led a Lega coalition as the town's first centre-right mayor; he was reelected in 2002. Marcazzan left to pursue national-level politics in 2007, and Anita Marchetti won the mayoral election with support from Lega and Forza Italia. Marchetti made the national news when she said that admission to the municipal kindergarten would be restricted to "the children of Christian parents". Marcazzan returned to challenge Marchetti, and was elected to a third term in 2012. Pietro Chiaventi, son of Socialist mayor Ilario Chiaventi, was elected mayor in 2017 at the head of a non-political civic list promising to "turn a new page" in Goito.

Since the early 2000s, a number of immigrants have settled in Goito and found work in local industries; some have acquired Italian citizenship. On 1 January 2020, 1,249 foreigners (12.4 percent of its population) lived in the town; this does not include naturalized Italian citizens. The largest immigrant group (536 in 2020) is from the North Indian state of Punjab. Most of the Indian immigrants are Sikhs, are employed by the local dairy industry as businesspeople or farmhands, and worship at a gurdwara in Rivalta sul Mincio. In 2015, an amritdhari Sikh resident of Goito was fined for carrying a kirpan. The fine was later upheld by the Corte Suprema di Cassazione, Italy's highest appeals court. The court's ruling, which has been interpreted as an infringement on Sikh religious liberty, was reported in international media as a ban on the kirpan. Indian MP Gurjeet Singh Aujla met with Italian diplomats to discuss the affair, and was told that no general ban of kirpans is in effect.

== Notable sites ==
=== Churches ===
- Church of Saint Peter the Apostle
- Church of Massimbona
- Church of St. Mary Virgin and Martyr at Solarolo

=== Castles ===
- Castle of Goito
- Castle of Cerlongo

=== Civic landmarks ===
- Civic Tower
- Bridge of Goito (Ponte della Gloria)
- Villa Giraffa
- Villa Moschini
- Corte Villabona
- Bersaglieri monument
- Municipal Theater

== Twin town ==
Goito has been twinned with Baienfurt, Germany, since 2005.
