= Battle of Goito =

1848 battle between Piedmontese and the Austrian army

- Part of the First Italian War of Independence
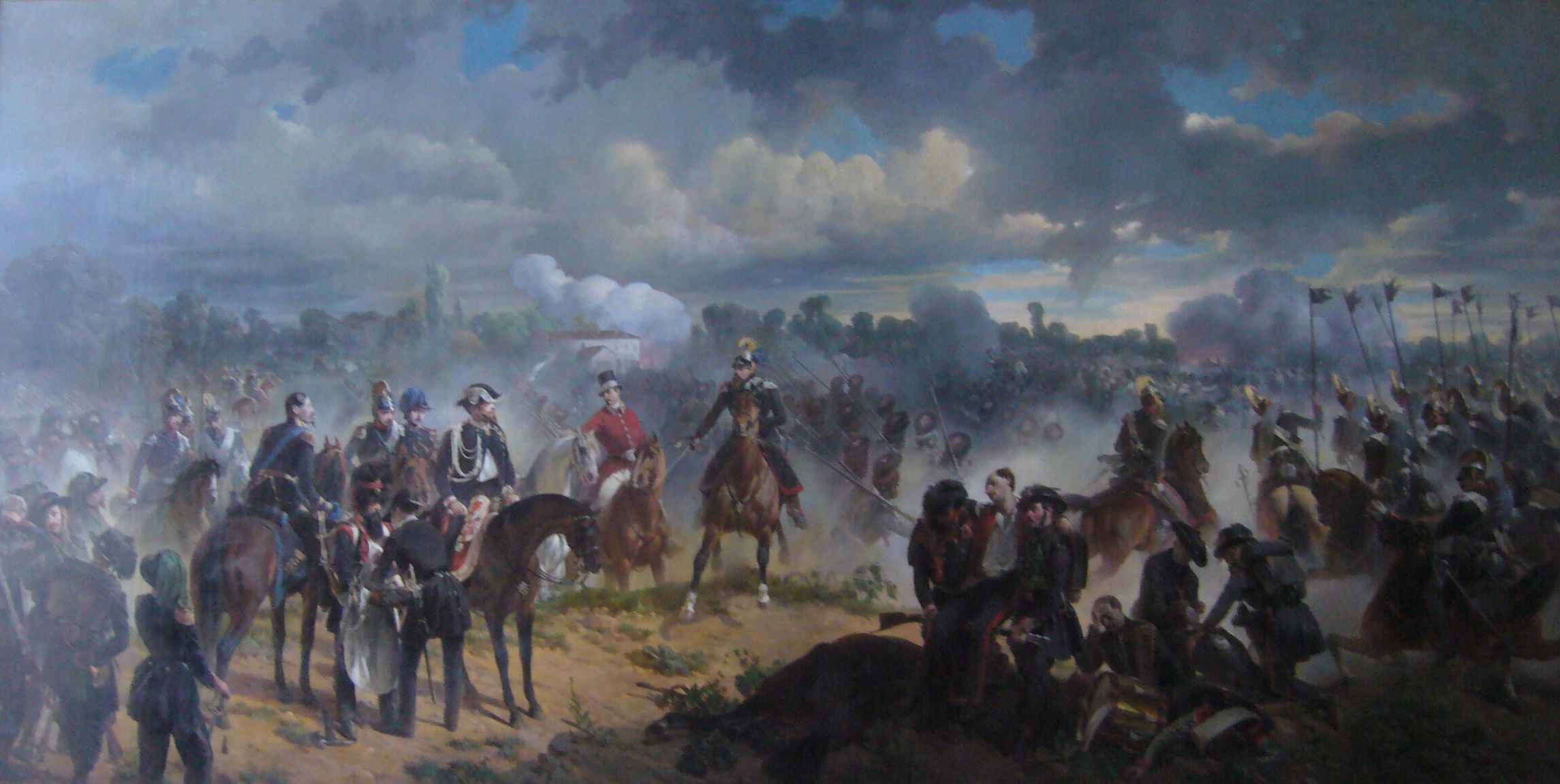
- Battlaglia di Goito by Felice Cerruti Bauduc
Date	30 May 1848
Location	Goito, Lombardy–Venetia (present-day Italy) 45°14′49″N 10°40′29″E
Result	Sardinian victory

Belligerents
Sardinia	Austria

Commanders and leaders
Charles Albert; Eusebio Bava	Karl of Schwarzenberg; OLt. Carl Mecséry †

Strength
14,700 infantry 2,400 cavalry 43 guns	11,200 infantry 950 cavalry 33 guns

Casualties and losses
46 killed 260 wounded 55 missing	68 killed including 2 Officers; 331 wounded including 21 officers 221 captured or missing including 3 officers

The Battle of Goito was fought between the Piedmontese and the Austrian army on 30 May 1848, in the course of the First Italian War of Independence. The Piedmontese army won the battle, as the Austrians were unable to break through to relieve the siege of Peschiera and prevent its surrender which happened on the day before the battle.

== Background ==
Having evacuated Milan after the Five Days of Milan on 22 March 1848, field marshal Radetzky regrouped his forces in the Quadrilatero, composed of the four supporting fortresses of Peschiera, Mantua, Verona and Legnago. The Piedmontese army advanced across Lombardy, brushing aside the covering forces under major general Wohlgemuth guarding the bridge over the Mincio at Goito during an engagement on 9 April 1848. The Austrians tried but failed to destroy the Goito bridge. Once across the Mincio, the Piedmontese forces fanned out towards the north and south.

On 10 April 1848, the Piedmontese army started to blockade the fortress of Peschiera, garrisoned by ca. 1,700 Austrian troops. Until the siege train arrived, the lack of siege guns hampered the effectiveness of the bombardment. Out of food after 34 days of blockade and 16 days under siege, the Austrians surrendered the fortress on 29 May 1848, just prior to the battle of Goito.

Meanwhile, Piedmontese and Austrian forces clashed in the battle of Pastrengo on 30 April 1848 on the Rivoli plateau. The first big test of arms occurred just outside Verona during the battle of Santa Lucia on 6 May 1848 where the Piedmontese army failed to defeat the Austrians. With a bloody nose, the Piedmontese army retired to the Mincio.

Unable to dislodge the Papal forces at Vicenza, field marshal Radetzky decided to concentrate his forces against the Piedmontese army. On 28 May 1848, he marched his army towards Mantua where a Tuscan Division was warily observing the fortress. While the Piedmontese army's attention was diverted by an Austrian brigade on the Rivoli plateau on 28 and 29 May 1848, field marshal Radetzky engaged and defeated the Tuscan division at the battle of Curtatone and Montanara on 29 May 1848. Many of the defeated and disillusioned Tuscan volunteers returned home, marking the end of the Tuscan division as a fighting force. Both the Piedmontese and the Austrian armies were now concentrated on the Mincio side of the Quadrilatero: the Piedmontese south of Peschiera, the Austrians in control of Mantua. Radetzky sent his troops north to relieve Peschiera.

== The battle ==
From Mantua, Radetzky sent his First and Reserve Corps towards Goito, while his Second Corps and the cavalry were ordered to reconnoiter towards Ceresara. The Piedmontese forces were deployed in two lines. The first line stretched from the banks of the Mincio at Goito westwards. The second line occupied heights above Goito. At around 14:00 on 30 May 1848, the cavalry vedettes of both sides established contact. Brigade Benedek leading First Corps advanced from Sacca towards Goito, coming under artillery fire from the Italian guns on the Somenzari heights at 15:30. The Austrians deployed their own artillery (12 guns and 3 rocket tubes) but were unable to break the Italian artillery superiority. Charles Albert, King of Sardinia, displayed personal bravery by exposing himself to the enemy artillery fire, gaining a scratch wound in the process.

While Brigade Benedek remained pinned before Goito, Brigades Wohlgemuth and Strassoldo advanced on his left, brushing aside the feeble opposition (which even fired on its own troops). To stem the Austrian progress, General Bava sent forward the Guards Brigade (on the right) and the Brigade "Aosta" (on the left) at 17:00. The progress of the Guards Brigade was checked by Brigade Gyulai of the Second Corps which was in the process of linking up with the First Corps. The Brigade "Aosta" pressured Brigade Wohlgemuth to withdraw. Brigade Benedek retired too when it was attacked by Neapolitan reinforcements. With darkness approaching at 19:00, both sides withdrew to their initial positions. Around this time, the King of Sardinia received the message about the Austrian surrender of Peschiera, ending the battle with the Italians in general jubilation.

Intense rainfall prevented all combat operations during the next day. Informed about the surrender of Peschiera and unable to overcome the Piedmontese army, field marshal Radetzky withdrew his forces on 2 June 1848. The Piedmontese lost 46 killed, 260 wounded and 55 missing in action at the battle of Goito. Austrian casualties were 2 officers and 65 men killed, general Felix Schwarzenberg and 18 officers and 311 men wounded, 2 officers captured, as well as 1 officer and 185 men missing in action.

== Outcome ==
The battle was a tactical draw, neither side managing to overcome the other; however, the Piedmontese army had fought defensively and had retained control of the field of battle, and prevented field marshal Radetzky from relieving Peschiera, therefore the battle is to be considered as an Italian victory. It lulled however the Piedmontese command into a sense of complacency, which, coupled with the lack of a clear strategical plan, would eventually allow Radetzky to overcome this failure, resume the offensive (proving this in the battle of Vicenza against the Papal forces on 10 June 1848) and eventually deal a decisive defeat to the Sardinian Army at the battle of Custoza.

== Sources ==
- Bortolotti, Vincenzo (1889). Storia dell'esercito sardo e de' suoi alleati nelle campagne di guerra, 1848-49. Stabilimento Tip. e Lit. Fratelli Pozzo. p. 185.
- Der Feldzug der oesterreichischen Armee in Italien im Jahre 1848: Kriegsbegebenheiten bei der kaiserlich österreichischen Armee in Italien vom 7. Mai bis 13. Juni 1848. Von der K.K. Buchdruckerey. 1848.
- Embree, Michael (2013). Radetzky's Marches: the Campaigns of 1848 and 1849 in Upper Italy. Helion & Company. ISBN 9781909384736. OCLC 855969679.
- Kunz, Hermann (1890). Die Feldzüge des Feldmarschalls Radetzky in Oberitalien 1848 und 1849 (in German). Leipzig: Verlag von Arwed Strauch.
- Pieri, Piero (1962). Storia militare del Risorgimento: guerre e insurrezioni. Torino: Giulio Einaudi.
