= Felice Cerruti Bauduc =

Italian painter (1818–1896)

- Born: 1818; Turin, Italy
- Died: 24 November 1896 (aged 77–78)
- Education: Horace de Vernet
- Movement: Orientalist

Felice Cerruti Bauduc (1818 – 24 November 1896) was an Italian artist born in Turin. He is known mainly for his genre paintings, military scenes and Orientalist subject matter. Some books on Orientalist art give his name as Felice Cerruti Beauduc.

== Life and career ==
Born in Turin in 1818 by Francesco, he was the son of Giacinta Cicero. After completing his studies in veterinary science at Fossano, Felice Cerruti Bauduc was engaged in the Italian War of Independence, 1840-1850. He subsequently decided to try and earn a living from painting and studied with Horace de Vernet, who specialised in military scenes, many inspired by North Africa. His early work often featured militarist themes, such as his Battle with Solferino and San Martino, while another painting depicted an episode of the Battle of Goito.

In the later years of his career, he turned his attention to Orientalist subject matter such as Arab Caravan (1875) and Fantasia arabe (1884).

Two of his large oil paintings, featuring Arab fantasies, are on display at the Gallery of Modern Art in Turin.

== Work ==
He worked primarily in oil on large canvases. His painting Pastori Nella Campagna Romana was sold on 29 November 1993.

=== Select list of paintings ===
- Battaglia di Goito (Battle of Goito) n.d.
- Sommacampagna, 1848
- Un Momento della Battaglia di Pastrengo (Scene from the Battle of Pastengo), 1855
- Scontro di Volta Mantovana, (Battle of Volta Mantovana) 1858
- La Tempe d'Edfou n.d.
- Caravan Arabe (Arab Caravan), 1875
- Fantasia arabe (Arabian Fantasy), 1874

=== Gallery ===
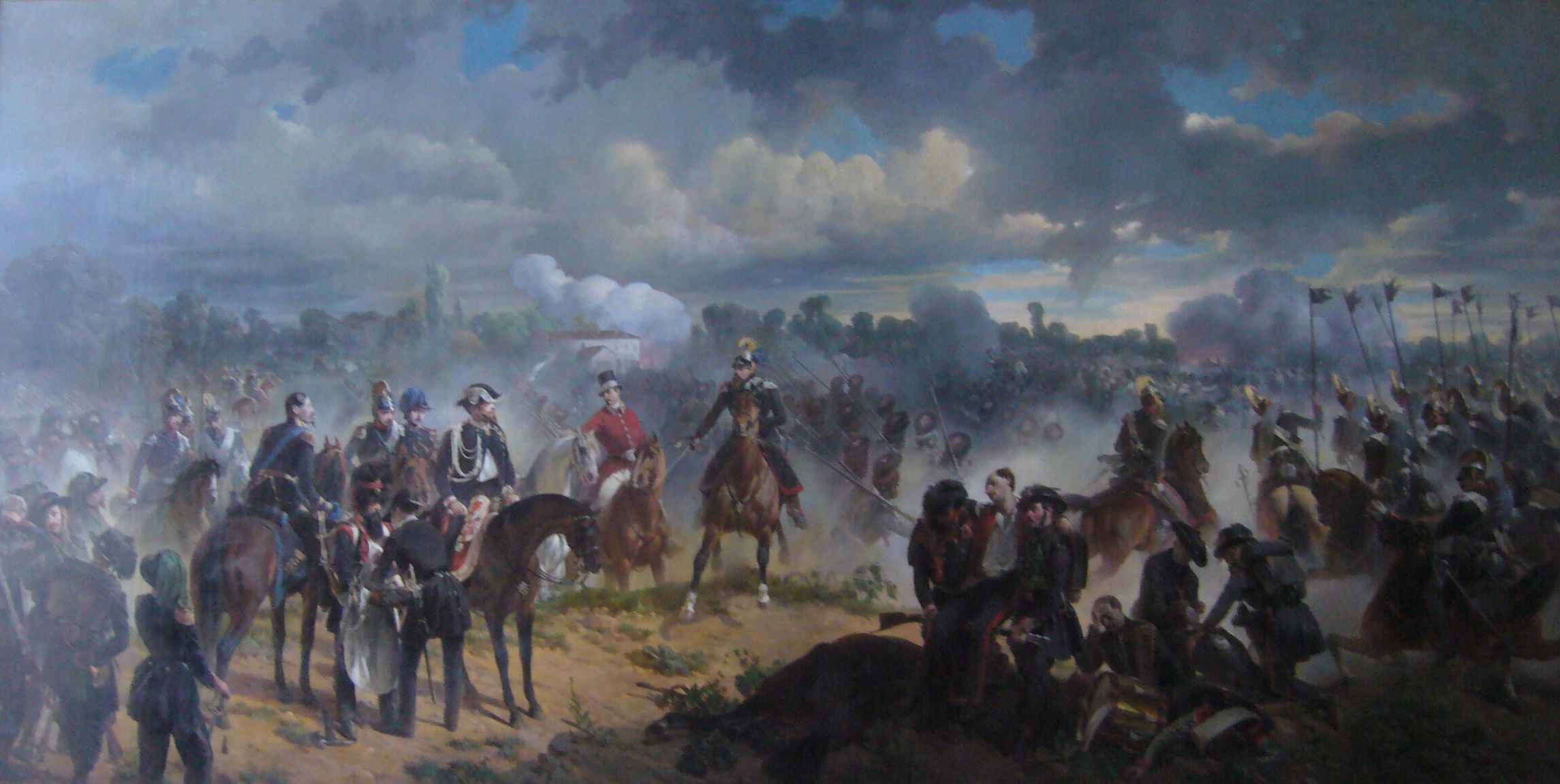
Battaglia di Goito Bauduc

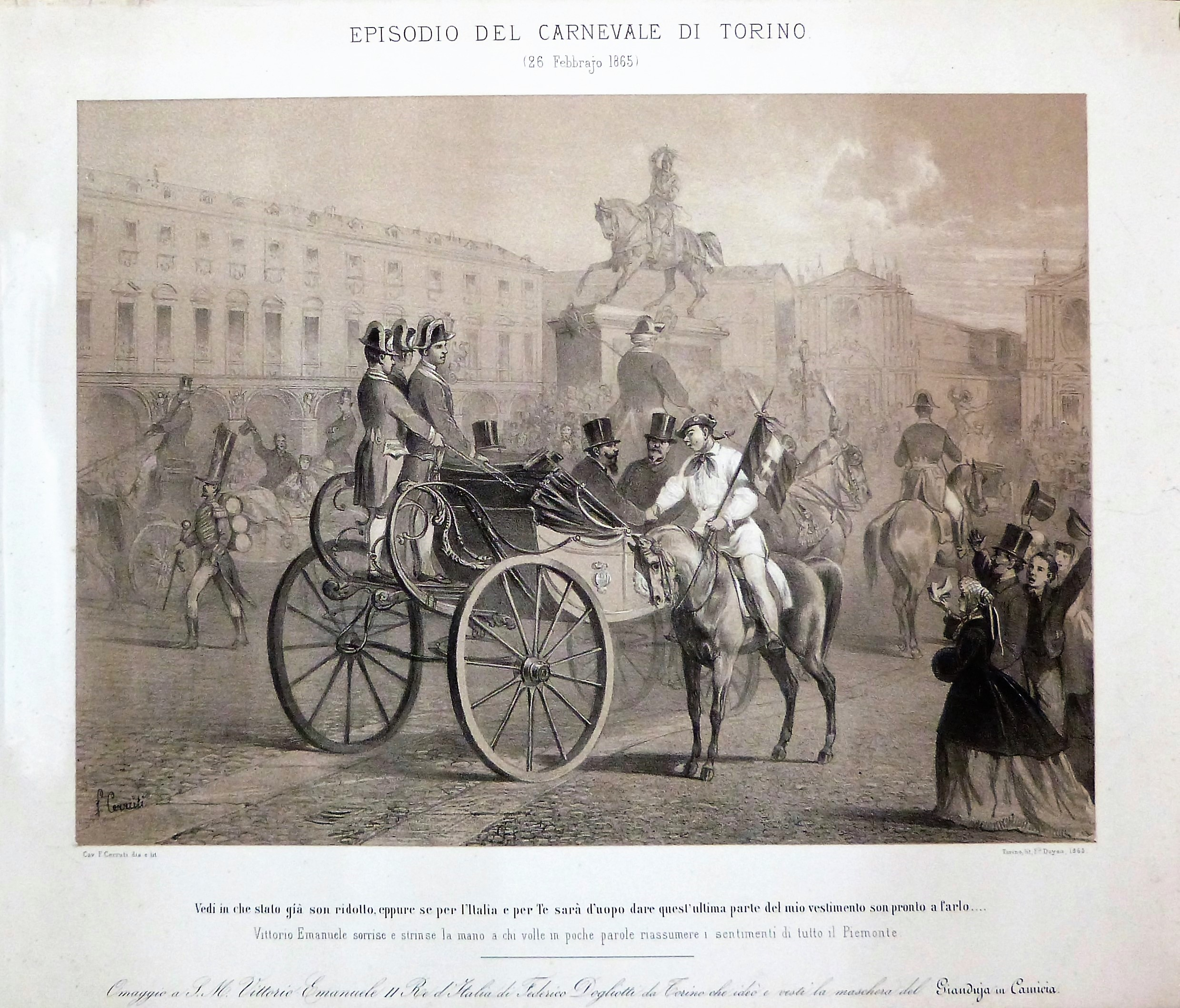
Carnevale di Torino, 1865

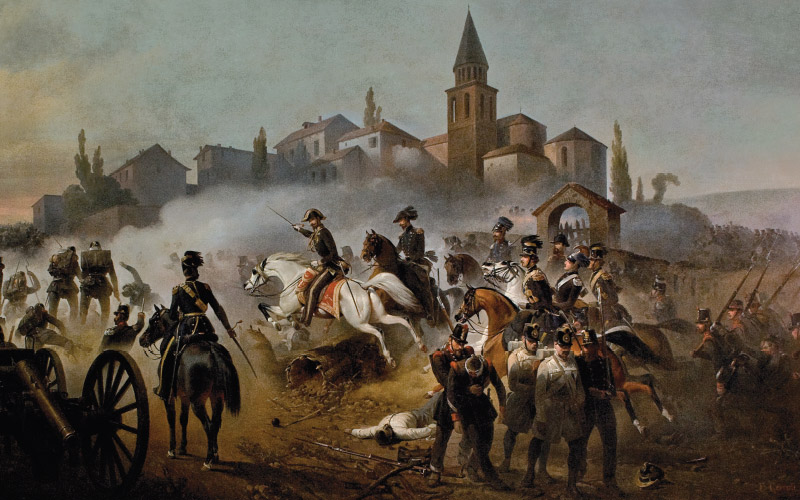
Sommacampagna, 1848 (Museo del Risorgimento di Torino)

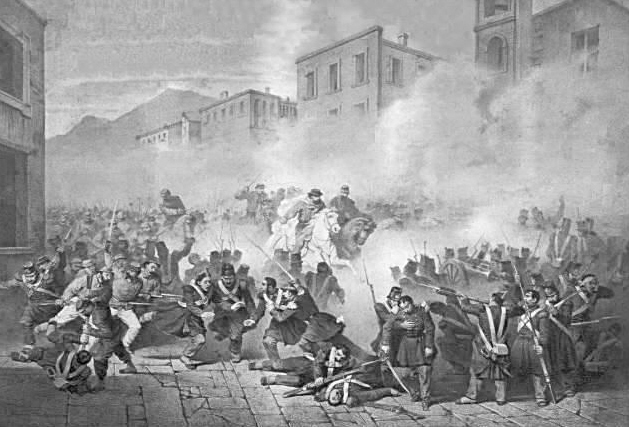
Garibaldi entra a Palermo da Porta Termini, (lithograph) c. 1861

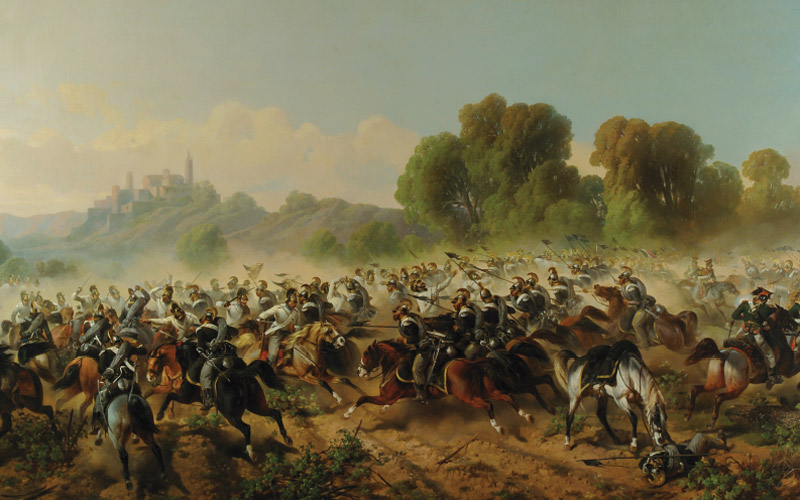
Scontro di Volta Mantovana, 1858

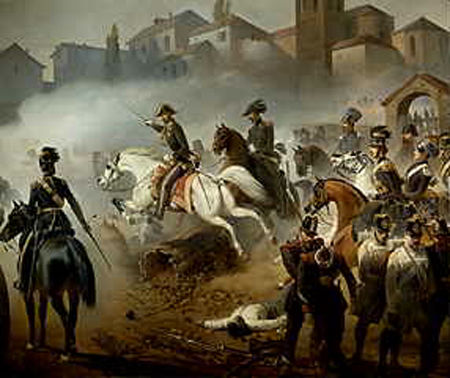
Un Momento della Battaglia di Pastrengo, 1855

== See also ==
- List of Orientalist artists
- Orientalism
