= Eusebio Bava =

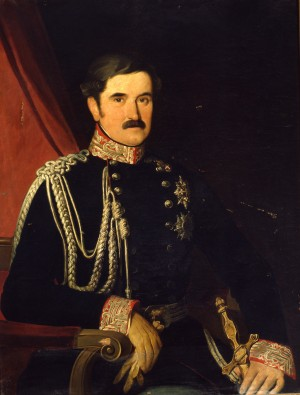
Portrait of General Eusebio Bava.

Eusebio Bava (6 August 1790, Vercelli – 30 April 1854, Torin) was an Italian general who served in the First Italian War of Independence.

== Biography ==
Born in Vercelli, Bava volunteered to fight under Napoleonic French flag against Prussia in 1806. He took part in the French campaigns in Spain and Portugal, where he was captured by the British at Porto in 1809. After Napoleon's abdication, Bava returned to Piedmont, where king Victor Emmanuel I integrated his troops into the Piedmontese army as the Cacciatori piemontesi battalion. In 1838, he was appointed commander of the Turin division, and two years later, he was promoted to lieutenant general.

During the First Italian War of Independence, General Bava commanded one of the two corps of the Piedmonese-Sardinian army under Charles Albert, as the latter launched an offensive against Austria in Lombardy. Despite the success of the Five Days of Milan, the Piedmontese army did not attack the retreating Austrian forces at their most vulnerable point and only followed them up to the Mincio river. Nonetheless, Bava achieved the first success of the war at Pastrengo and later proposed a plan to engage the enemy in battle. However, the plan was heavily modified, ultimately leading to a defeat at Santa Lucia. Although the war initially went relatively well, tensions arose between Bava and other leading commanders—including the king, War Minister Antonio Franzini, and Ettore Gerbaix De Sonnaz—due to the lack of decisive leadership from Charles Albert and discord among his advisors. Bava's own short temper added to the difficulties in command.

When Josef Radetzky launched an offensive, defeating the Tuscan division at Curtatone and Montanara, Bava managed to halt his advance with a victory at Goito. However, a subsequent delay allowed Radetzky to regain the initiative, defeating the Piedmontese at Custoza and pushing them back into Lombardy. Though the army had retained its cohesion, Bava was convinced that the campaign was lost and was determined to lead the forces back to Piedmont.

After an armistice was signed on 9 August, Bava, believing that King Charles Albert had proved himself as an unequal commander in chief, remained de facto the head of the Piedmontese army, and was duly named Generale in Capo (General in Chief) on October 22. However, when Wojciech Chrzanowski was appointed by the King as the army's Chief of Staff, Bava, seeing this as yet another sign of the King's meddling in the army, and seen by a portion of the public opinion as responsible for the unsuccessful campaign, published a scathing report on it to exonerate himself and declaring that Charles Albert's indecision had been the biggest factor in the defeat. This led to the King and the government to agree on Bava's dismissal, and on 16 February 1849, he was formally removed from his position, and replaced by Chrzanowski (albeit ambiguously as Charles Albert's chief of staff).

Appointed Senator in 1848, Eusebio Bava died in Turin in 1854.

== Assessment ==
Italian military historian Piero Pieri observed about Bava that, despite his flaws, he was the best army commander available to Sardinia-Piedmont during the Risorgimento.

== Sources ==
- Page at Dizionario Biografico degli Italiani (in Italian)
- Piero Pieri, Storia Militare del Risorgimento, 1962, Giulio Einaudi Editore, Torino
