= Battle of Custoza (1848) =

1848 battle of the First Italian War of Independence

First Battle of Custoza
- Part of the First Italian War of Independence
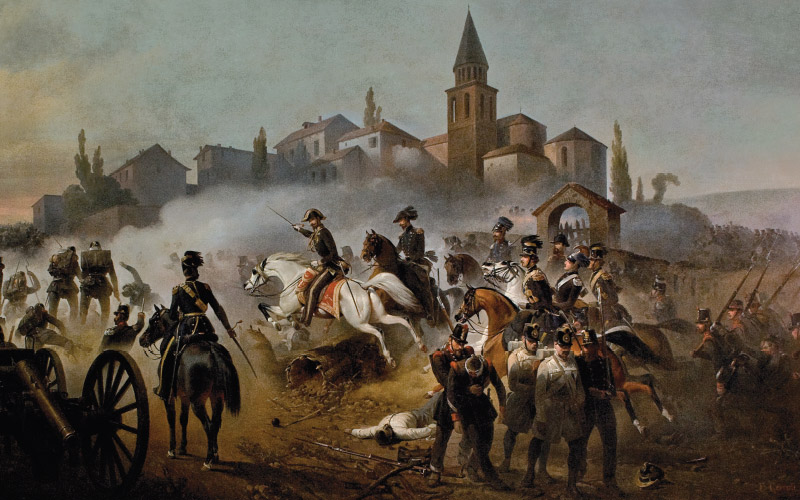
- Battle of Custoza by Felice Cerruti Bauduc, c. 1855
Date	22–27 July 1848
Location	Custoza, Lombardy-Venetia (present-day Italy) 45°23′N 10°48′E
Result	Austrian victory

Belligerents
(Austrian Empire) Austria	(Kingdom of Sardinia) Sardinia

Commanders and leaders
(Austrian Empire) Joseph Radetzky (Austrian Empire) Konstantin d’Aspre	(Kingdom of Sardinia) Charles Albert (Kingdom of Sardinia) Eusebio Bava

Strength
33,000; 157 guns	22,000; 42 guns

Casualties and losses
319 killed including 5 officers 1,282 wounded including 32 officers 1,829 captured or missing	288 killed 883 wounded 463 captured or missing

The First Battle of Custoza was fought on July 24 and 25, 1848, during the First Italian War of Independence between the armies of the Austrian Empire, commanded by Field Marshal Radetzky, and the Kingdom of Sardinia, led by King Charles Albert of Piedmont-Sardinia.

== Background ==
In March 1848, the city of Milan launched an uprising against Austrian occupation. Charles Albert supported the Milanese revolt and declared war on Austria. Venice also declared its independence from Austria. The Austrian Field Marshal Radetzky withdrew his forces from Milan to the defensive positions based on the four fortresses known as the Quadrilateral: Verona, Mantua, Peschiera, and Legnago. The Piedmontese took Peschiera after a short siege, but Radetzky received substantial reinforcements.

== Battle ==
Around July 25, the Piedmontese Army was widely dispersed on the war theatre, from the Rivoli plateau on the north to Governolo on the south. Marshal Radetzky attacked, on July 23, the Piedmontese II Corps (commanded by General Ettore Gerbaix De Sonnaz), and forced it to retire first before Peschiera and then, after another successful attack on the 24th, behind the river Mincio, splitting the Piedmontese Army in two.

The Piedmontese High Command reacted slowly and uncertainly to the news coming from the north, and eventually it was decided to attack the Austrian army in the rear towards the village of Staffalo, with the bulk of the I Corps (led by General Eusebio Bava); the attack, begun in the afternoon of the 24th, was successful and the single brigade which covered this area was forced to retreat. However, this lulled the Sardinian commanders into complacency, and spurred Radetzky to stop his advance beyond the Mincio and march on these enemy forces.

For the 25th, the Piedmontese were ordered to attack the enemy further in the area, while the II Corps was instructed to support the attack from the Mincio (however General De Sonnaz refused to obey the order, claiming that his troops were too tired); but what was supposed to be an offensive soon turned into a desperate battle to hold the advancing enemy. For the whole day, the outnumbered Piedmontese were subjected to attacks by two Austrian army corps, and by the end of the day the whole line had been forced to move back; however, the retreat was done in an orderly way and with the men fighting.

== Aftermath ==
While not a total victory (in fact, the Austrians had suffered higher losses than the Piedmontese and all major Piedmontese units kept their cohesion and their equipment), the battle was nonetheless a considerable reversal. On the 26th Piedmontese troops sought to prevent the Austrians from crossing the Mincio at the battle of Volta Mantovana. Their failure to do so and a decisive Austrian victory meant that the Piedmontese were first forced to retreat westwards to a new defensive line behind the river Oglio, and then further to Milan. After a small battle at the outskirts of Milan an armistice (originally of six weeks and then prorogued) was signed, and the Piedmontese Army retreated within the borders of the Kingdom of Sardinia.

The attempt to renew the war effort the next year resulted in another victory for Radetzky and the effective end of the First Italian War of Independence. The Austrian marshal returned all the rebellious provinces to Austrian rule.

== In popular culture ==
Johann Strauss I's Radetzky March was commissioned to commemorate Radetzky's victories at this battle.

== See also ==
- Revolutions of 1848 in the Italian states

== Sources ==
- Pieri, Piero (1962). Storia militare del Risorgimento: guerre e insurrezioni. Torino: Giulio Einaudi.
- Berkeley, George Fitz-Hardinge (1940). Italy in the Making Vol.III. Cambridge University Press.
- Der Feldzug der oesterreichischen Armee in Italien im Jahre 1848: Kriegsbegebenheiten bei der kaiserlich österreichischen Armee in Italien vom 7. Mai bis 13. Juni 1848. Von der K.K. Buchdruckerey. 1848.
- Berkeley, George Fitz-Hardinge (1968). Italy in the Making Vol.III. Cambridge University Press.
