= Giovanni Ghirlandini =

Italian painter (1725–1791)

Giovanni Ghirlandini (17 August 1725 in Valeggio sul Mincio, Republic of Venice – After 1791) was an Italian painter, mainly depicting sacred subjects.

== Biography ==
It is unclear under whom Ghirlandini trained, although he was likely influenced by the circle of Cignaroli of Verona, and Giuseppe Bazzani in Mantua.

Among his altarpieces, are a Madonna and child with Saints Francis and Luigi Gonzaga for parish church of San Matteo at Quaderni. He painted oval canvases of St Anthony of Padua and St Francis of Paola for the parish church of San Lorenzo at Nogarole Rocca. He painted an Immaculate Conception for the parish church of Casaleone. The altarpiece of Saints Anthony of Padua, Vincent Ferrer, and Bovo in adoration of the Holy Heart at San Pietro in Vincoli at Affi is attributed to him. He painted a Crucifix with Jesuit Saint and San Vincenzo Ferrer (1769) for the parish church of Goito. In 1776, he painted an altarpiece for the church of Bondeno di Gonzaga He painted an altarpiece of St Nicola of Bari (1787) for the parish church of Cereta.

He completed much of the fresco decoration for the church of Roverbella in 1766–1768, although some attribute only repainting of prior frescoes by Bazzani. Both artists contributed to the frescoes of the parish church of Pozzolo. In the parish church of Cadioli, the frescoes are attributed to Ghirlandini alone. He was employed in frescoing sacred subjects, including at Villa Colpani-Sandri at Caprino Veronese. He frescoed a Blessed Paola Montaldi, St Mary Magdalen, Virgin, and Trinity with angels (1773) for the ceiling of sacristy of the parish church of Volta Mantovana.
