= Bridge castle =

Type of fortification

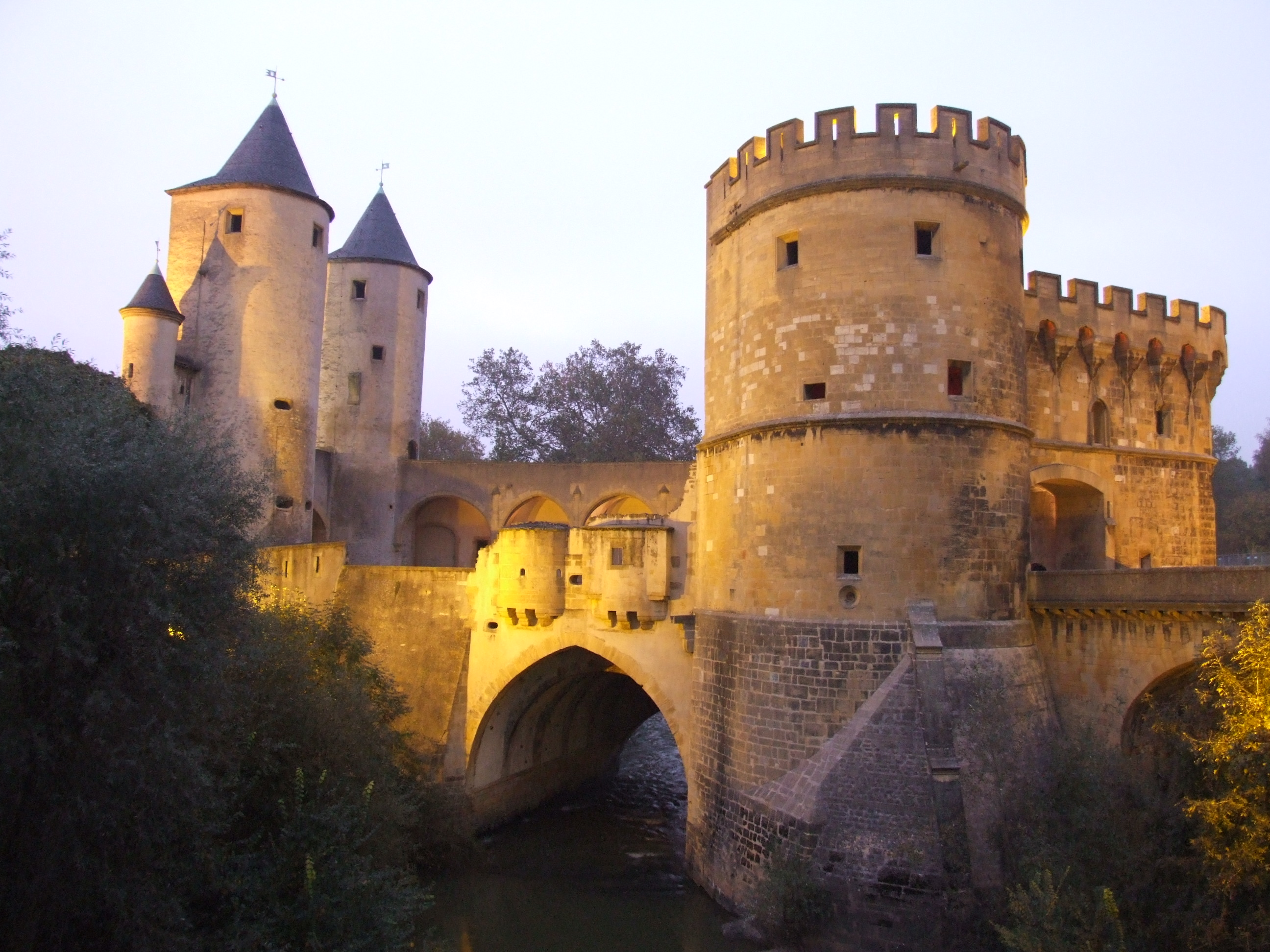
The Germans' Gate in Metz

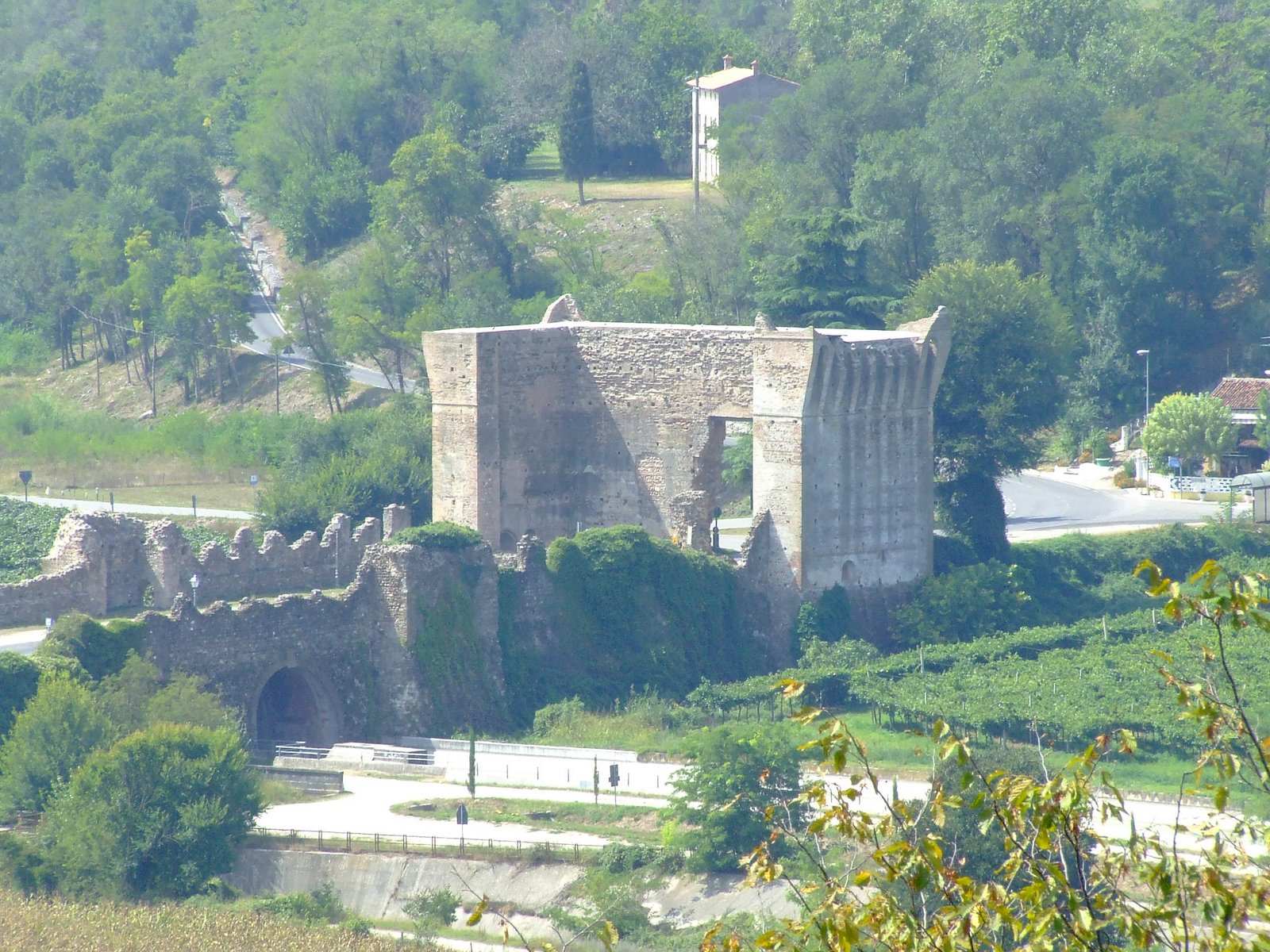
A gateway to the North Italian bridge castle of Valeggio sul Mincio

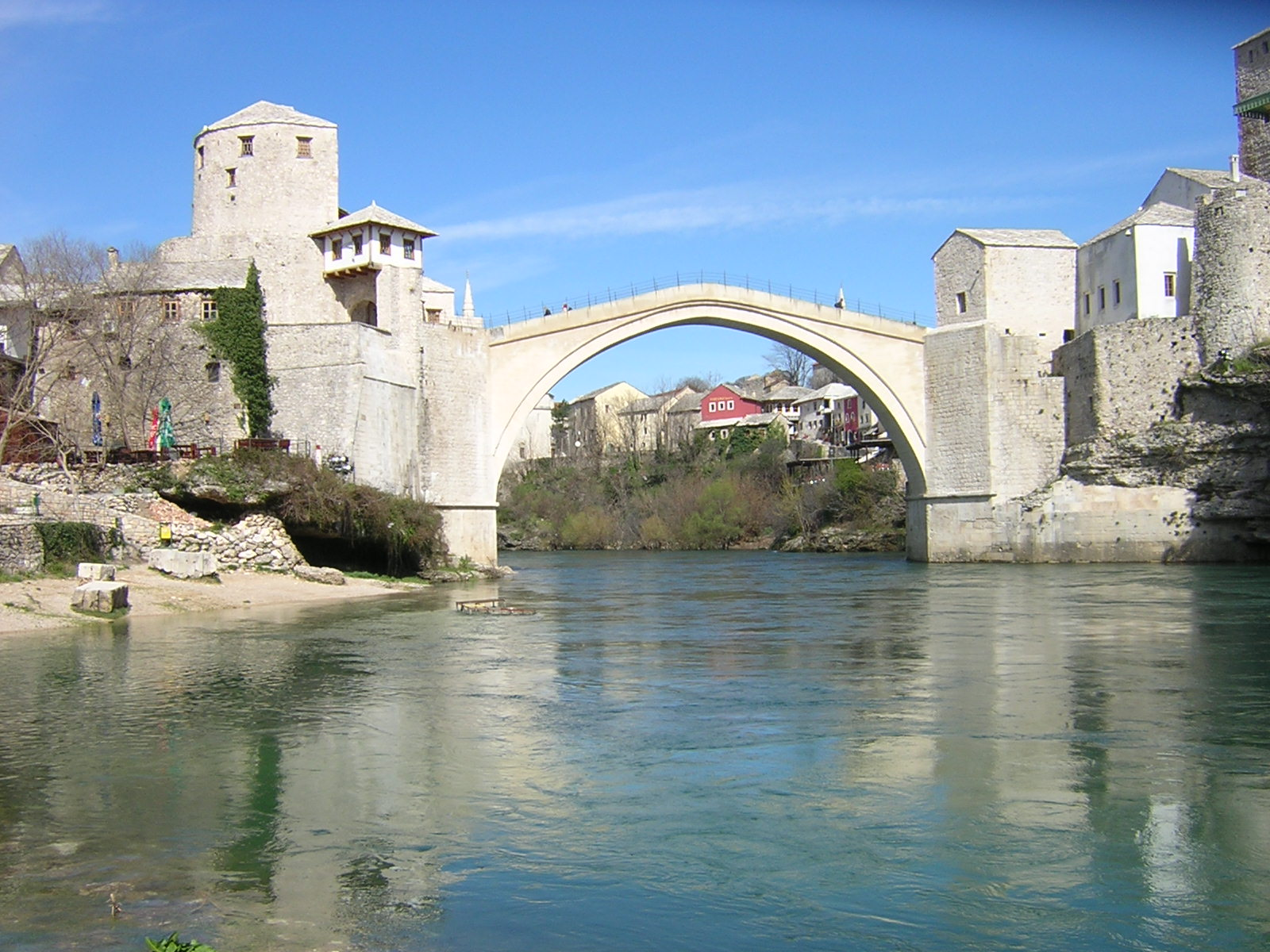
The bridge castle of Stari Most in Mostar

A bridge castle (German: Brückenburg) is a type of castle that was built to provide military observation and security for a river crossing. In the narrower sense it refers to castles that are built directly on or next to a bridge. Sometimes, however, castles close to a bridge are referred to as bridge castles.

These fortifications were often designed as toll castles that charged river tolls and were occupied only by a guard force. In Europe, several examples of bridge castles have survived, especially in the south and southeast of the continent.

The bridge castle type—which is only rarely mentioned in detail in the specialist literature—is not always clearly distinguishable from the "fortified bridge". In medieval Europe, numerous river crossings were protected by tower structures and outworks.

== Examples ==
The largest preserved bridge castle is the rectangular edifice of Valeggio sul Mincio (Province of Verona, North Italy). In the Late Middle Ages, Gian Galeazzo Visconti ordered the construction of a mighty bridge fortress under the four-winged inner bailey of the local castle between Mantua and Lake Garda. The bridge fort lies about 100 metres (300 ft) in height below the hill castle. Three gateways were linked by curtain walls to 14 demi-bastions. The gate tower below the hill castle is of a strikingly weak design. The living rooms of the guards were in the central gateway. This gateway barred access to the crossing in a similar way to the rear gateway with a massive crossbeam.

The Germans' Gate across the Seille river in Metz is the last bridge castle found in France. The bridge castle displays fortified towers, battlements, and machicolations. The German's Gate dating from the 13th century played a crucial defensive role during the Siege of Metz in 1552–1553 by Emperor Charles V. Bullet impacts coming from the muskets during the assaults still can be seen on the facade.

The Hohenstaufen double tower gate on the Roman bridge across the Volturno in Capua, Italy, is classified as a bridge castle. Frederick II of Hohenstaufen built here a representative "state building" as the gateway to the Kingdom of the Two Sicilies, whose surviving ruins give little indication of its former importance.

The famous bridge castle of Stari Most in Mostar (Bosnia-Herzegovina) was partly destroyed in 1993 by Bosnian-Croatian troops, but later rebuilt. Originally, around 1450, two great fortified towers on both sides of the river guarded a suspension bridge, which was replaced in 1566 by a stone arch bridge.

== Fortified bridges ==
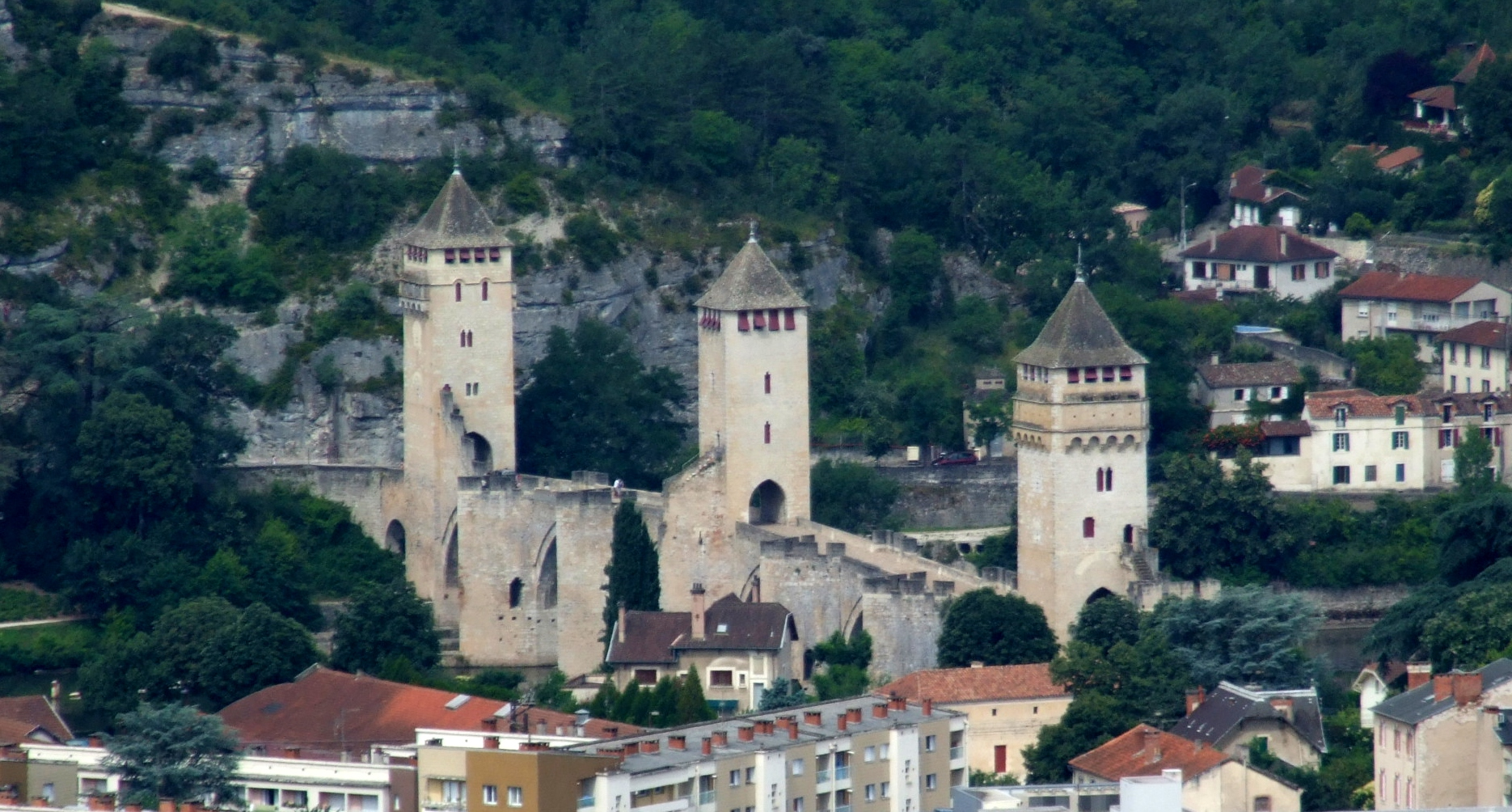
One of the best-preserved fortified bridges in Europe: the Pont Valentré of Cahors

A typical example of a fortified bridge is the Pont Valentré near Cahors (Midi-Pyrénées) in Southern France. The site is almost totally preserved apart from the eastern barbican (fortified gate) which was removed in the 19th century. In Germany and Central Europe only ruins of bridge fortifications have generally survived. Usually there are only the individual gate towers, for example as on the Stone Bridge in Regensburg and the Charles Bridge in Prague.

== Sources ==
- G. Ulrich Großmann: Burgen in Europa. Regensburg, 2005, p. 220–223. ISBN 3-7954-1686-8
