= Battle of Villabuona =

Battle of the Thirty Years War

- Part of Thirty Years' War and of the War of the Mantuan Succession
Date	29 May 1630
Location	Villabona, Comune di Goito, Lombardy, Italy 45°15′19″N 10°42′26″E
Result	Imperial victory

Belligerents
Holy Roman Empire	Venice; Kingdom of France

Commanders and leaders
(Holy Roman Empire) Matthias Gallas	(Kingdom of France) Duc de Candale (Republic of Venice) Zaccaria Sagredo (Republic of Venice) Ludovico Vimercati (Kingdom of France) Chevalier de la Valette (POW)

Strength
10,000 troops	17,500 troops

Casualties and losses
400 killed and wounded	4,000 killed, 500 captured

The Battle of Villabuona (sometimes spelled "Villabona") was fought on 29 May 1630 in the frazione of Villabona (a locality in the comune of Goito) in southern Lombardy during the Mantuan war of succession between an allied Franco-Venetian army led by the Venetian provveditore Zaccaria Sagredo and the French commander Duc de Candale on one side and the Imperial army of Mathias Gallas on the other. The more numerous Franco-Venetians and their Mantuan allies hoped to end the Imperial siege of Mantua but were comprehensively defeated by Gallas' smaller force, numbering perhaps 10,000 men. The defeat was tactically and strategically significant for the allies and "rendered the outcome of the siege of Mantua a foregone conclusion", leading to the collapse of the city's defenses and its infamous sack later that year.

== Position of the two armies ==
The Genoese Pietro Giovanni Capriata states in his influential, pro-Hapsburg account of the war of Mantuan succession that in the lead up to the clash the larger French and Venetian army had left Venetian territory and marched south-west to face the Imperial army then gathered at Goito, a town in the contested territory of the Duchy of Mantova controlling the road between Mantua and Verona and a key crossing on the river Mincio. As they advanced closer to the enemy the French and Venetian commanders made "resolutions (...) to take Villabuona, Marengo [a locality in the comune of Marmirolo] and San Britio [also in the comune of Marmirolo], which are places near Valeggio". Later accounts supplied by the Venetian historian and author Girolamo Brusoni specify that the Chevalier de la Valette, half-brother of the French commander, the Duc de Candale, occupied the village of Marengo, while Venetian commander colonel Ludovico Vimercati occupied and fortified with trenches the nearby hamlet of Villabuona. The Duc de Candale, Zaccaria Sagredo and the greater part of the Franco-Venetian forces all seem to have still been in nearby Valeggio Sul Mincio, the principal market-town of the area, when the engagement between Franco-Venetians and Imperial troops began on 29 May.

== Venetians at Villabuona ==
The battle took place in and around the Venetian position at Villabuona. Girolamo Brusoni states that the Venetians had dug trenches in Villabuona after taking over the place, but this is denied by the Mantuan historian Federico Amedei, who insists that no fortifications were present, and that the village was a mere hamlet with no real defenses. The contemporary Creman historian Ludovico Canobio states instead that the principal part of the hamlet of Villabuona consisted of a large walled farmhouse with a courtyard and four entrances to it, and that the Venetian commander Vimercati - who was from Crema, and may have supplied Canobio with his account of the engagement - had ordered "some earthbanks to be raised and to also to make in the walls some slits and holes for muskets". He also adds that just before the engagement began three companies of Venetian light horsemen ("cappelletti") had come to Villabuona to reinforce Vimercati's detachment.

== Battle ==
The first clash between the two opposing armies occurred outside of Villabuona as "some companies of Croats" from the Imperial army and Venetian "cappelletti" that were scouting the countryside ran into each other. The Venetian historian Vianoli's account of the battle uses the ethnic term "Albanesi" instead of the specific military term "cappelletti" (towards the end of 17th century Croati a Cavallo was official term used for Dalmatian light cavalary in Venetian service) for the Venetian troops involved in the opening phase of the battle against the Croats, but as most cappelletti were recruited in Dalmatia and Venetian Albania (modern day Boka), the two terms were sometimes used interchangeably, and so Vianoli is most likely referencing the same body of light cavalry. All Venetian accounts of the battle suggest that though the Cappelletti fought valiantly against the Croats, they were outnumbered and soon found themselves in difficulty. The arrival of French cavalry and Mantuan volunteers led by the Chevalier de la Valette won the cappelletti some reprieve, but the Franco-Venetian troops were eventually driven back to their defensive positions in the hamlet of Villabuona. Pietro Giovanni Capriata's account suggests the arrival of a large group of German soldiers in Imperial pay was crucial in turning the tide and forcing the French and Dalmatians to retreat to the hamlet after the initial engagement with the Croat troops. Imperial troops then attacked the hamlet. Brusoni states that three assaults were repealed before a carefully placed six-gun battery drove the Venetian forces away, allowing Imperial forces to take control of the village, and to capture the Chevalier de la Valette in the ensuing fight. Capriata, the pro-Imperial chronicler writes that German cannon-fire was key in capturing Villabuona. Canobio states instead that the Chevalier de la Valette was captured during an ill-fated cavalry sortie out of the fortified farmhouse, as he tried to link up with more French and Venetian reinforcements advancing at that time from Valeggio. Canobio also states that de la Valette's capture demoralized the defenders. Hard-pressed by Imperial artillery fire and with no relief in sight the Franco-Venetian survivors had to retreat towards Valeggio. Canobio adds that colonel Vimercati managed to maintain some degree of discipline among the retreating Venetian infantry, and that musket fire kept the Imperial pursuers at bay. Both Brusoni and Capriata state that an attempt by Venetian forces from Valeggio to either recapture part of the hamlet or to relieve its beleaguered defenders failed, and that Venetian horsemen were driven away by accurate Imperial musket-fire issuing from the newly captured buildings in the hamlet.

== Retreat from Valeggio sul Mincio ==
After the loss of Villabuona, on the morning of 30 May, the battered Franco-Venetian army decided to quit Valeggio and to seek refuge at Peschiera or in other forts in the territory of the Republic. But the retreat to Venetian territory turned into a catastrophic rout, and the Venetian army disintegrated as it was pursued by Imperial forces and Gallas caught up with the allied rearguard. Only a reargued action fought by the Duc de Candale's French contingent saved the allied army from total disaster, though it resulted in the destruction of the greater part of the Duc de Candale's personal force. Capriata writes that 4,000 "Venetians" (a number possibly including French casualties too) were killed in the engagements, and that 26 banners - of which 4 were French fleur-de-lys flags - were captured during the battle at Villabuona and the following rout from Valeggio sul Mincio. Capriata also notes that the slain and wounded amongst the "Tedeschi" did not amount to 400, but provides no number of Croat or other Imperial dead and wounded.

== Aftermath ==
After the battle, the Venetian authorities opened an investigation into the purportedly dishonorable conduct of the Venetian provveditore Zaccaria Sagredo, then commander in chief of the Venetian forces on campaign and the man responsible for ordering the disastrous retreat from Valeggio. Sagredo was found guilty of unbecoming conduct and sentenced to ten years of rigorous imprisonment and to a perpetual ban from public office - a sentence which was almost immediately commuted to confinement in the then Venetian town of Sibenik in Dalmatia. Sagredo was soon allowed again to hold public office, and eventually became podestá of Padua.
