= Henry de Nogaret de La Valette =

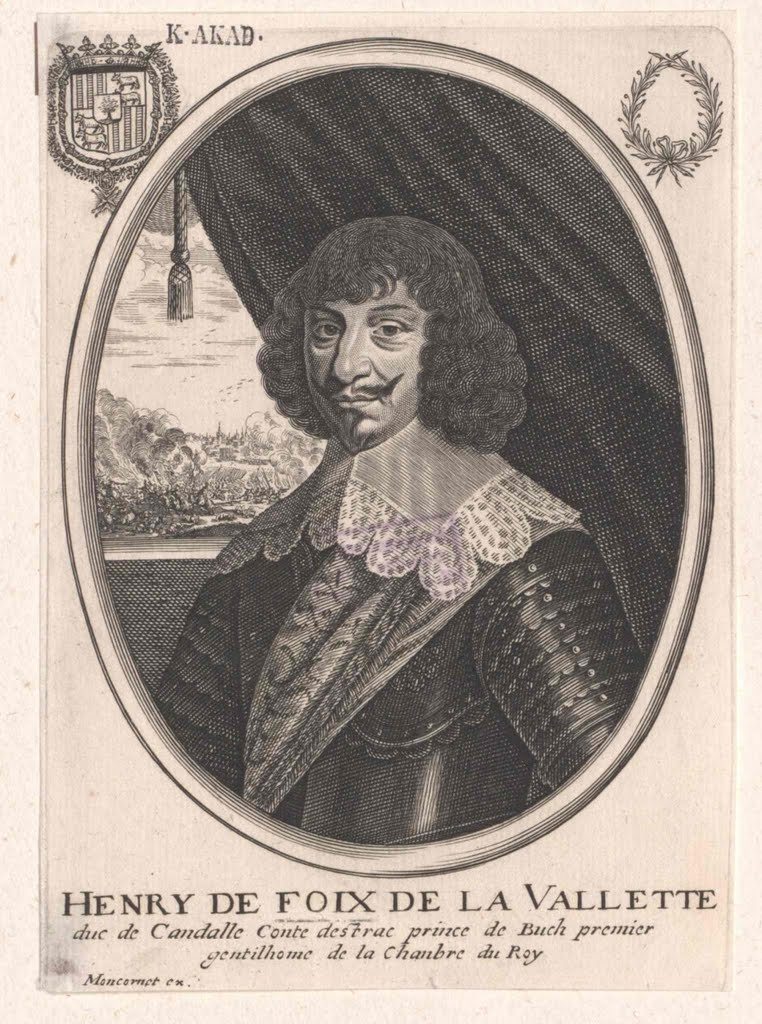

Henry (Henri) de Nogaret de La Valette (died 1639) was the eldest son of Jean Louis de Nogaret de La Valette (1554–1642), first Duke of Épernon and Admiral of France, and his wife Marguerite de Foix (1567–1593), comtesse de Candale. From his mother Henri inherited the title of Comte de Candale, becoming the 7th of that line, and was generally known by such title.

Henri made a career of the military, serving under Richelieu, in the armies of Guienne, of Picardy and of Italy.

During the war of Mantuan succession he was made commander in chief of the allied Franco-Venetian army gathered at Valeggio sul Mincio in order to bring an end the Imperial siege of Mantua and relieve the beleaguered and famished town. The operations to relieve Mantua were however disastrously unsuccessful, and on 29 May 1630 the Franco-Venetian allies were comprehensively defeated at the battle of Villabuona by the Austro-Italian general Matthias Gallas. In the battle the duc de Candale's own half-brother, the Chevalier de la Valette, was captured.

He was created duc de Candale in 1621, but that title became extinct upon his death and his brother Bernard succeeded him as the 8th Comte de Candale.
