= Erbé =

- Comune
- Comune di Erbé
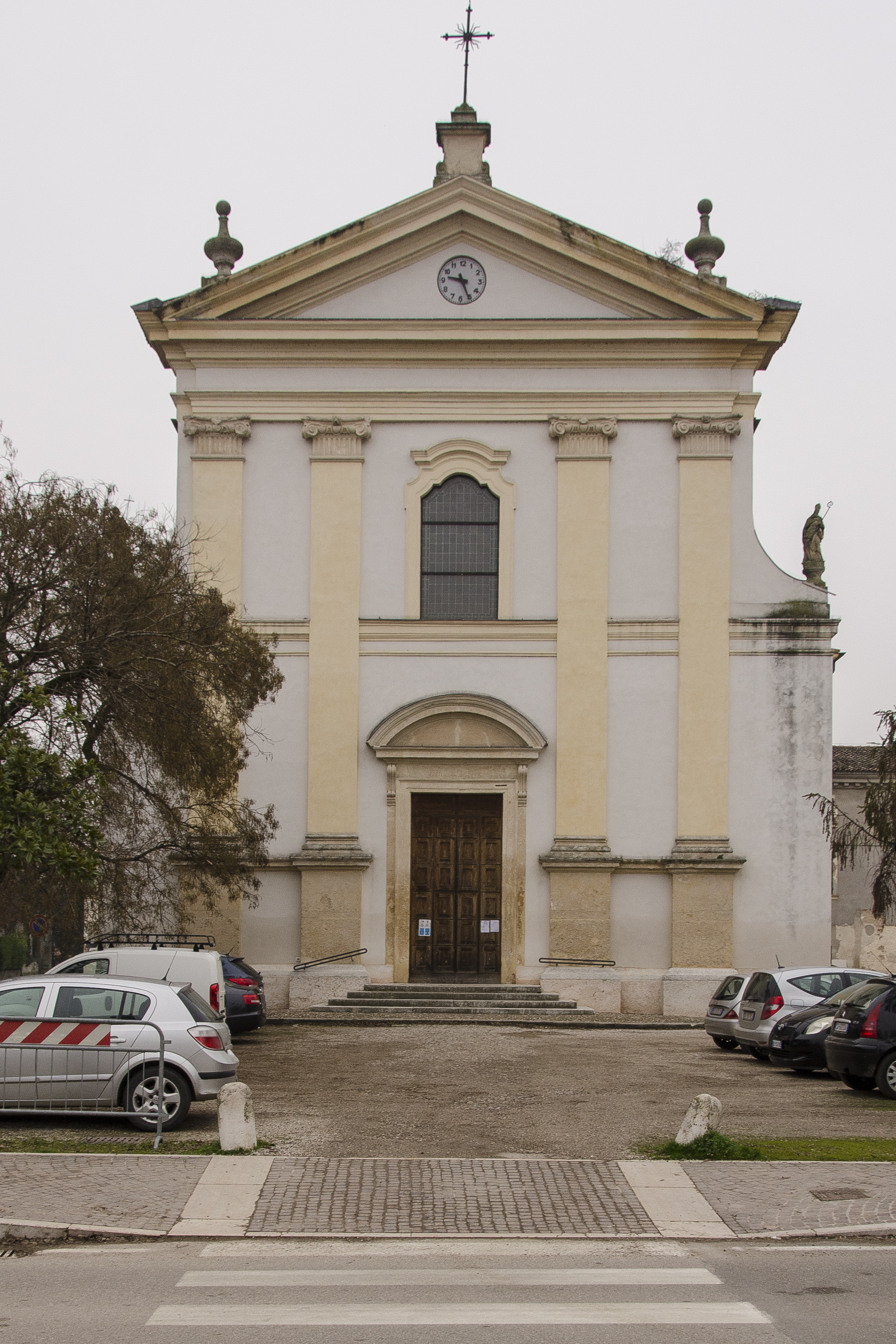
- San Giovanni Battista church

- Location within Italy Location within Veneto
- Coordinates: 45°15′N 10°58′E
- Country: Italy
- Region: Veneto
- Province: Province of Verona (VR)

Area
  - Total: 15.9 km^{2} (6.1 sq mi)
- Elevation: 22 m (72 ft)

Population (Dec. 2004)
  - Total: 1,619
  - Density: 102/km^{2} (264/sq mi)
- Demonym: Erbetani
- Time zone: UTC+1 (CET)
  - Summer (DST): UTC+2 (CEST)
- Postal code: 37060
- Dialing code: 045

Erbé is a comune (municipality) in the Province of Verona in the Italian region Veneto, located about 110 kilometres (68 mi) west of Venice and about 20 kilometres (12 mi) south of Verona. As of December 2008, it had a population of 1,720 and an area of 15.9 square kilometres (6.1 mi^{2}).

Erbé borders the following municipalities: Castelbelforte, Isola della Scala, Nogara, Sorgà, and Trevenzuolo.

== Demographic evolution ==
Historical population

Year	Pop.	±%
1861	?	—
1871	1,757	—
1881	1,776	+1.1%
1901	1,803	+1.5%
1911	1,954	+8.4%

Year	Pop.	±%
1921	2,141	+9.6%
1931	2,120	−1.0%
1936	2,105	−0.7%
1951	2,184	+3.8%
1961	1,860	−14.8%

Year	Pop.	±%
1971	1,556	−16.3%
1981	1,608	+3.3%
1991	1,581	−1.7%
2001	1,629	+3.0%

Source: Data from ISTAT
