= Antonio Mantovani =

Italian serial killer

- Born: 1957; Trevenzuolo, Verona, Italy
- Died: 28 March 2003 (aged 45–46); Saluzzo Prison, Saluzzo, Cuneo, Italy
- Cause of death: Suicide by hanging
- Other names: "The Monster of Milan" "The Sadist of Milan"
- Conviction: Murder x3
- Penalty: 29 years imprisonment (Zacchi); Life imprisonment (1997 murders)

Details
- Victims: 3–4
- Span of crimes: 1983–1997
- Country: Italy
- State: Milan
- Date apprehended: 28 January 1998

Antonio Mantovani (1957 – 28 March 2003), known as The Monster of Milan (Italian: Il mostro di Milano), was an Italian serial killer. Originally convicted of murdering a woman in 1983, he was later paroled, after which he killed two, possibly three, women in Milan between 1996 and 1997.

Tried and convicted for two of the latter murders, Mantovani was sentenced to life imprisonment. He committed suicide two years after his conviction.

== Early life ==
Antonio Mantovani was born in 1957 in Trevenzuolo, Verona. He had a difficult childhood marked by a terrible relationship with his mother, a prostitute who had an affair with a carabiniere. She refused to take of the young boy and eventually sent him away to a boarding school in 1964. From the beginning, Mantovani began to exhibit unstable behavior and unhealthy sexual urges, attempting to rape a 3-year-old girl at the age of 14. He was not prosecuted for this crime as he was still a minor, but was left unsupervised, leading to the young Mantovani frequenting Lambro Park, a place frequented by drug addicts.

As time passed, Mantovani developed an increasingly dangerous and disturbed personality, and in 1979, he was arrested after an attempted sexual assault on a friend's wife, but was let go when the woman retracted her complaint.

After this, he began heavily abusing drugs and started committing numerous robberies throughout Milan using stolen guns. In the 1980s, he worked as a porter in Sesto San Giovanni.

== Murders ==
=== Carla Zacchi ===
On the morning of 11 February 1983, the naked body of a woman was found in a canal in Lucino. The body was immediately identified as belonging to Carla Zacchi, a 26-year-old office worker, who had been beaten and strangled.

Investigations revealed that a few days earlier, Raffaele Colaianni, the victim's husband and a long-time friend of Mantovani, had gone out for dinner with friends, leaving his wife home alone. Zacchi was lured out by Mantovani with an excuse, and once the pair were alone, he began to make sexual advances towards her, which she refused.

At this refusal, Mantovani became enraged, violently beating and then strangling her to death, before throwing the body into the canal. The fact that he was missing at the dinner attended by Colaianni was noted, and some witnesses later stated that they had seen wounds on Mantovani's hands. All of this, paired with Mantovani's suspicious attitude, led to his arrest a few days later. He would later be tried, convicted, and sentenced to 29 years imprisonment.

=== Imprisonment and semi-open regime ===
Following his conviction, Mantovani was transferred to serve his sentence at the Opera Prison. During his incarceration, Mantovani gave the impression that he had changed and could gradually reintegrate into society. The psychiatrists who treated him deemed that he was rehabilitated, but still retained his explosive temper and strong sexual frustration.

In 1996, after serving 13 years, Milan's Supervisory Court granted him the ability to leave prison for work after hearing a positive recommendation from supervisors at the Opera Prison and two psychiatric reports. Following his decision, Mantovani rented a room in Milan and found work in an IT company, where he spent most of his day before returning home to sleep.

=== New murders ===
On 31 October 1996, a recently released drug trafficker and mafia associate, 38-year-old Dora Vendola, was found strangled with a belt inside her Fiat Panda in Milan. When investigators learned that she was an acquaintance of Mantovani, he immediately became the prime suspect and was even charged with her murder. While investigating the crime, detectives learned that Mantovani had turned off his work computer for three hours without any good explanation, in addition to him admitting that Vendola had rejected his sexual advances. However, as he refused to admit responsibility and they did not have enough evidence to charge him, he was let go.

On the evening of 7 March 1997, a 26-year-old hairdresser named Simona Carnevale walked out of her store in Milan and seemingly disappeared. She made her last phone call to her sister, saying that she would return later that evening. There was no further news about her until 1 March 1999, when an anonymous letter was sent to the program Chi l'ha visto? in which an "assault against Simona in the subway" was mentioned. On 1 June of that year, the Milan authorities issued a detention order against Mantovani, who was out of jail at the time of the crime. Carlo Fermi, his cellmate, said the man had returned to his cell that night agitated and had confessed to him that he had killed a girl, even showing him the dead body in the trunk of his car. According to Fermi's testimony, Mantovani was acquainted with the victim. Despite this, Carnevale's body has never been found.

In the midst of this investigation, the charred remains Mantovani's landlord, 60-year-old Cesarina De Donato, were found on 2 June in a landfill in Rogoredo. The woman's body was surrounded by twenty dolls and several perfumes, and was found on her bed with two plastic bags over her head. This led investigators to believe that the killer had staged a suicide.

== Arrest, trial and death ==
During the course of the investigation, Mantovani was deemed the prime suspect in both cases, but remained on the run until 28 January 1998, when he was captured in Clusone. Mantovani changed his reasons as to why he fled, initially claiming that it was because he would be "framed" for the Vendola murder, and then to being tortured by Albanian drug dealers over a debt.

He was charged with both murders, and on 12 November 2001, he was sentenced to life imprisonment. He never confessed to either murder, and maintained that he was innocent.

After his conviction, he was transferred to the Saluzzo Prison. He filed an appeal against his sentence, but it was rejected by the Supreme Court of Cassation. Shortly after the denial, Mantovani hanged himself on 28 March 2003.

== In the media and culture ==
Mantovani's crimes were covered on the third episode of Detectives – Cai sosolti e irrisolti.

== See also ==
- List of serial killers by country
