= Palazzina Gonzaghesca di Bosco Fontana =

Coordinates: 45.2007°N 10.7457°E

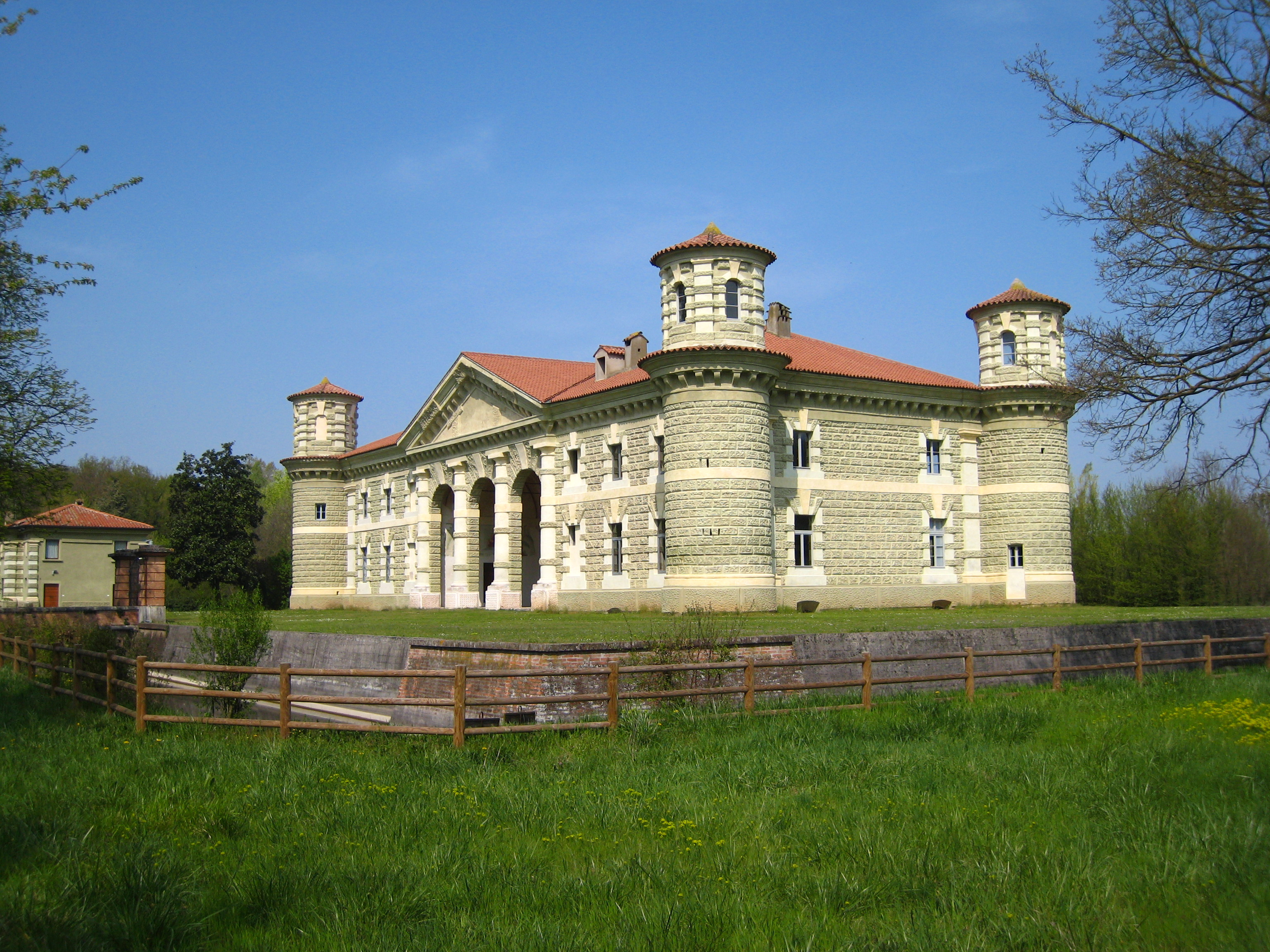
View of Palazzina and surrounding moat.

The Palazzina Gonzaghesca di Bosco Fontana or Palazzina di Caccia Gonzaga di Bosco della Fontana is a rural structure outside of the town of Marmirolo, near Mantua, in the region of Lombardy, Italy. The building has shared features that overlap with contemporary villas, castles, and hunting lodge or aristocratic delizia building that structurally. The rural structure is surrounded by moat, and has four corner towers, resembling castle turrets. In addition to some surrounding lands, it is owned by the local park service.

It was erected at the end of the 16th century by Duke Vincenzo I Gonzaga, using the architects Giuseppe Dattaro and Antonio Maria Viani. When it was used as a hunting lodge, the surrounding forests were populated with exotic animals for hunting.
