= Visconti Bridge =

Medieval dam and bridge in Veneto, Italy

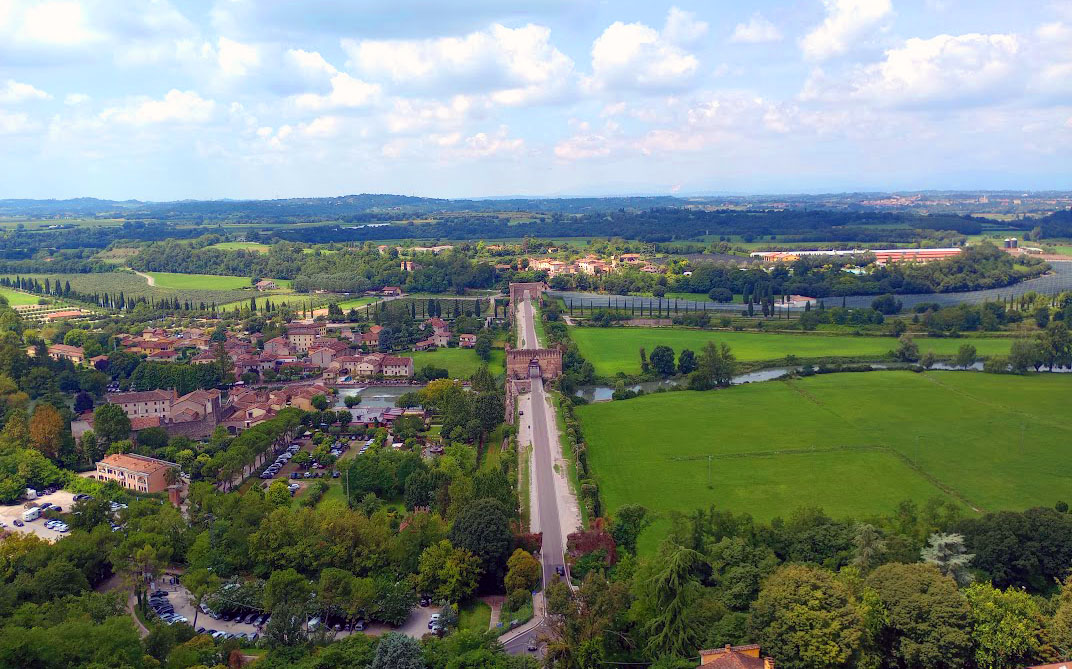
- Visconti Bridge from east
- Coordinates: 45°21′17″N 10°43′33″E
- Carries: Two-lane road
- Crosses: Mincio River
- Locale: Valeggio sul Mincio

Characteristics
- Design: Dam, then viaduct
- Material: Stone and Bricks
- Total length: 525 metres (1,722 ft)
- Width: 22 metres (72 ft)
- Height: 9 metres (30 ft)

History
- Designer: Domenico da Firenze, also known as Domenico di Benintendi di Guidone
- Constructed by: Gian Galeazzo Visconti
- Opened: End of 14th century
- Closed: From 1701 to the beginning of the 20th century

Location
- Interactive map of Visconti Bridge

The Visconti Bridge at Valeggio sul Mincio is a medieval viaduct over the Mincio River built at the end of the 14th century by Gian Galeazzo Visconti, Duke of Milan. Initially conceived as a fortified dam to divert the Mincio water flowing to Mantua, it has served as a bridge since then. Today, the ruined central span over the Mincio is replaced by a steel structure.

== History ==
=== Gian Galeazzo Visconti's project to deviate the Mincio River and dam's construction (14th century) ===
In 1393, when his relationship with Francesco I Gonzaga, lord of Mantua, suffered a crisis, Gian Galeazzo Visconti began building a dam on the Mincio river to divert its water from its natural course. The initial objective of that construction was to dry out the three lakes surrounding Mantua, fed by the Mincio's water. Interrupting the river's flow would have made Mantua defenseless and even uninhabitable.

In addition to the dam's construction, the project implied excavating a canal through the hills separating the Mincio from the Adige River, toward which the water would have flown. Despite the enormity of the excavation required for the canal, the Gonzagas and their allies became convinced of Gian Galeazzo's intention to divert the Mincio's water permanently.

The canal excavation was probably interrupted in the autumn of 1393 due to a flood of the Mincio, which damaged its initial course. The objective of the complete diversion of the Mincio's water was soon considered unachievable and abandoned. The dam could still represent a means to weaken Mantua's defense by temporarily interrupting water flow toward the three lakes.

The dam is 525 metres (1,722 ft) meters long. To resist the pressure of water expected to be collected in the reservoir formed by the Mincio, it is 25 metres (82 ft) meters wide at the base and 22 metres (72 ft) meters wide at the top. Four fortified towers complement the construction. The two outermost towers had a drawbridge to control the dam's access and the passage from one side of the valley to the other. Between the two central towers, the dam had four transverse tunnels through which the Mincio water could flow. A mechanism inside the tunnels allowed the interruption of the water flow.

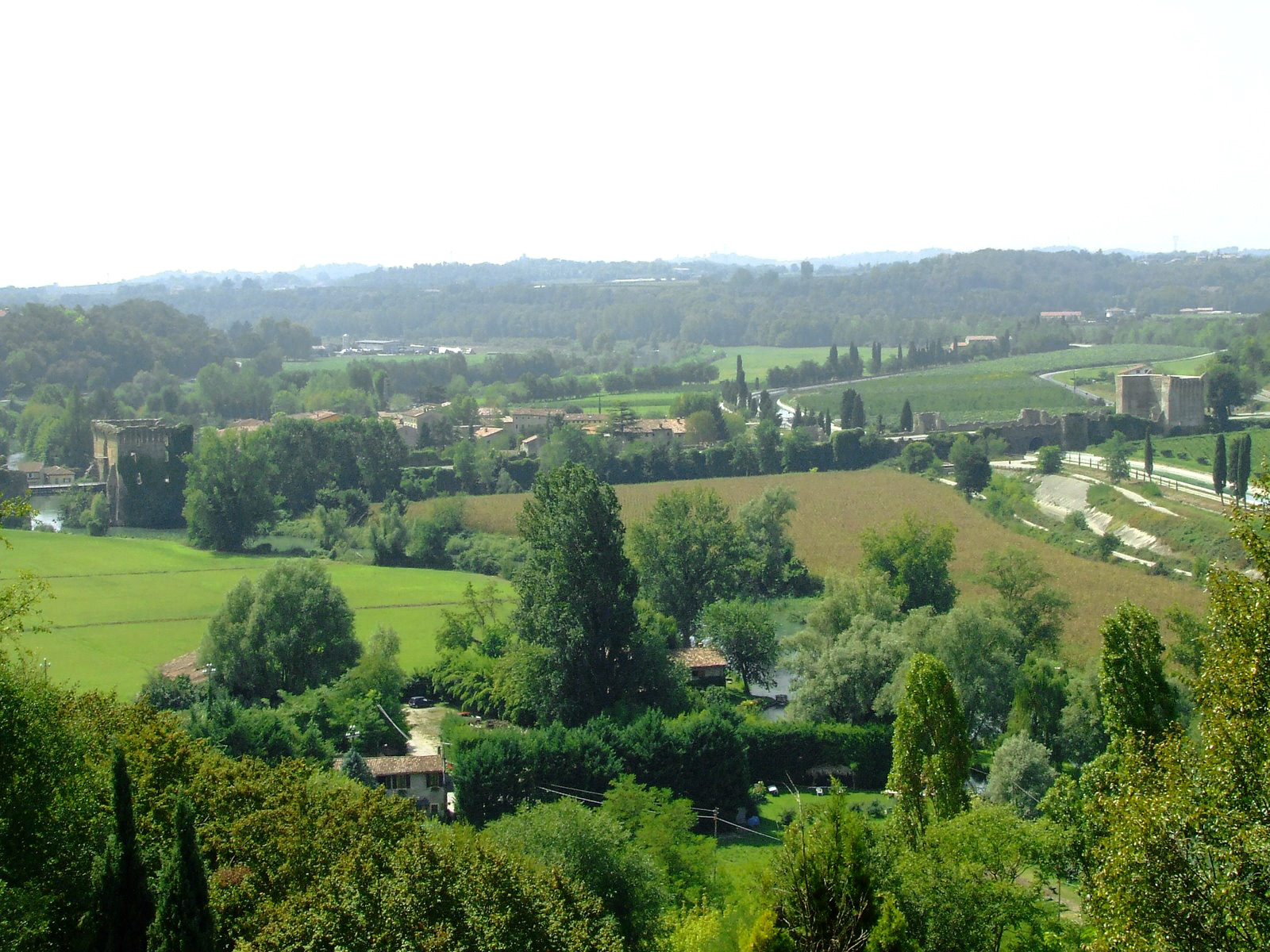
View of the western part

The engineer Domenico da Firenze, also known as Domenico di Benintendi di Guidone, led the project. Despite his failure to divert the Mincio, Gian Galeazzo Visconti commissioned him with a similar project a few years later to divert the Brenta River near Bassano del Grappa and deprive Padua of its water.

=== Use as a bridge, damages, and reopening as a viaduct in the modern era ===
The Visconti's dominion ceased in the 15th century, and the dam project was definitively abandoned. Since then, the dam has been used to cross the Mincio Valley. In 1701, the French blew up the central part, under which the Mincio flowed, to prevent the imperial army under the command of Eugene of Savoy from crossing the Mincio. At the beginning of the 20th century, the demolished section was replaced with a steel structure, and the bridge reopened.

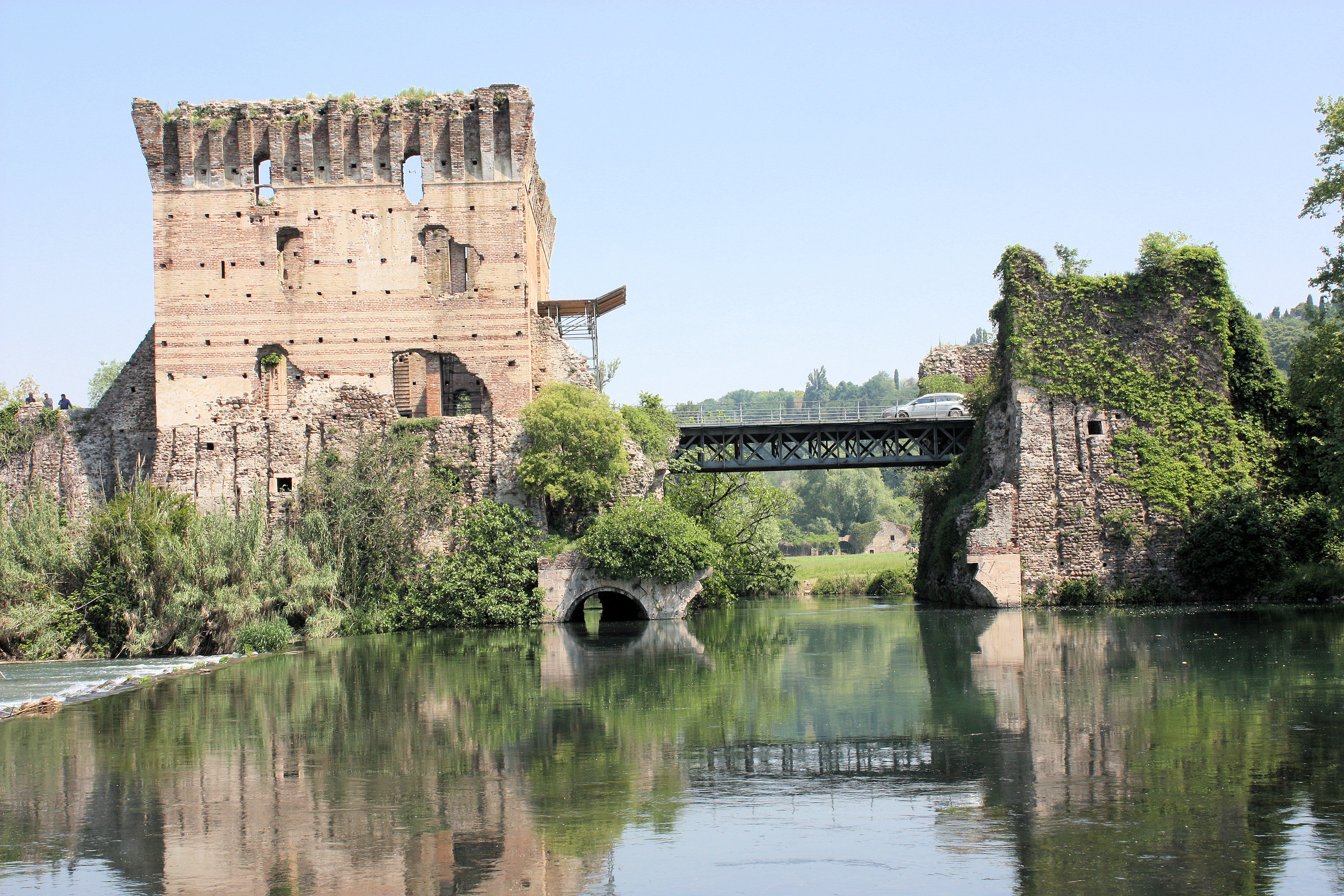
The remains of the two central towers and the destroyed span over the Mincio, replaced by a metal structure

== Today ==
The bridge's 600th anniversary was celebrated in 1993. Since then, every year, on the third Tuesday in June, a 1.5 km long double row of tables is organized along the entire bridge to celebrate an ample feast called "Festa del nodo d'amore" (Party of the Love Knot).

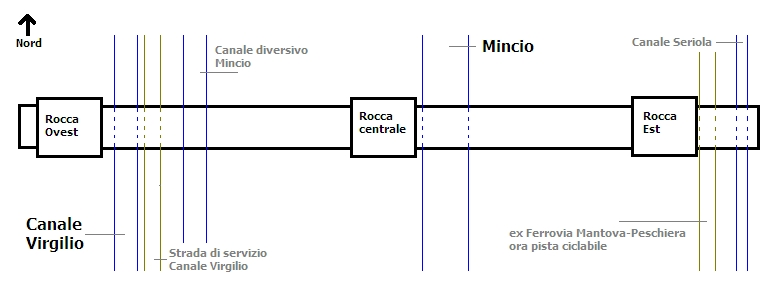
Schema of the viaduct, with the recently built underpasses (a road, three canals, and a disused railway); the span over the Mincio is at its center

== See also ==
- Bridge castle

== Sources ==
- Bueno de Mesquita, Daniel Meredith (1941). Giangaleazzo Visconti, Duke of Milan (1351-1402): a study in the political career of an Italian despot. Cambridge: Cambridge University Press. OCLC 878867551.
- Fohrer, Eberhard (2016). Gardasee (in German) (8th ed.). Michael Müller Verlag=Erlangen. ISBN 9783956542015. OCLC 920692475.
- Varanini, Gian Maria (1994). "Ingegneria militare, guerra e politica nel processo di costruzione dello stato territoriale. Osservazioni a margine della ricerca di G. Sandri sul ponte visconteo di Valeggio sul Mincio". In Filippi, Ezio (ed.). Il ponte visconteo a Valeggio sul Mincio (in Italian). Sommacampagna: CIERRE Edizioni. pp. 73–96. OCLC 1183923052.
- Vincenti, Antonello (1981). Castelli viscontei e sforzeschi (in Italian). Milano: Rusconi Libri S.p.A. OCLC 8446824.
