= Mozzecane =

- Comune
- Comune di Mozzecane
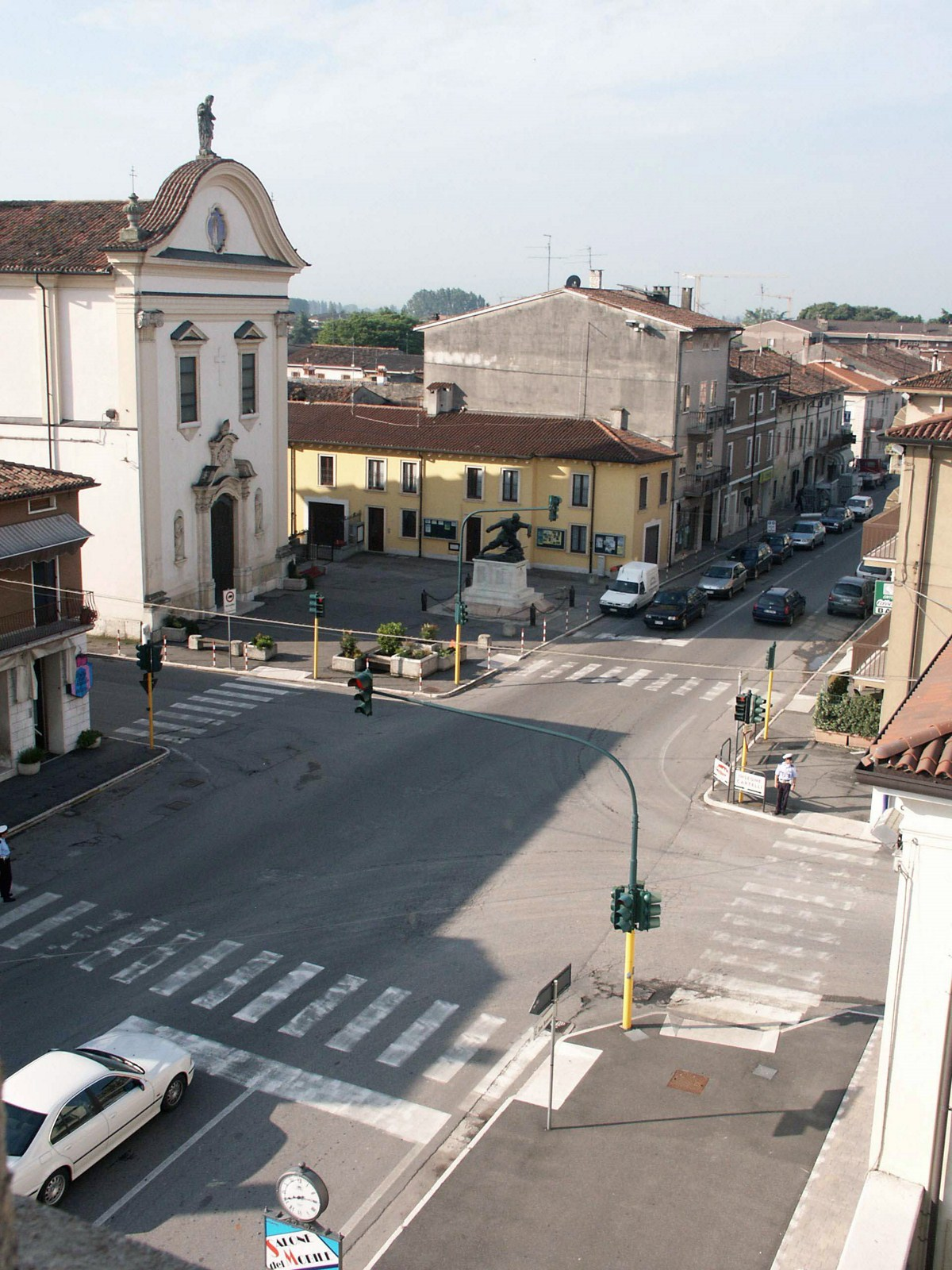
- View of central Mozzecane

- Location within Italy Location within Veneto
- Coordinates: 45°18′N 10°49′E
- Country: Italy
- Region: Veneto
- Province: Province of Verona (VR)
- Frazioni: Grezzano, Quistello, San Zeno, Tormine

Area
  - Total: 24.7 km^{2} (9.5 sq mi)
- Elevation: 47 m (154 ft)

Population (Dec. 2004)
  - Total: 5,611
  - Density: 227/km^{2} (588/sq mi)
- Demonym: Mozzecanesi
- Time zone: UTC+1 (CET)
  - Summer (DST): UTC+2 (CEST)
- Postal code: 37060
- Dialing code: 045

Mozzecane is a comune (municipality) in the Province of Verona in the Italian region Veneto, located about 120 kilometres (75 mi) west of Venice and about 20 kilometres (12 mi) southwest of Verona. As of 31 December 2004, it had a population of 5,611 and an area of 24.7 square kilometres (9.5 mi^{2}).

The municipality of Mozzecane contains the frazioni (subdivisions, mainly villages and hamlets) Grezzano, Quistello, San Zeno, and Tormine.

Mozzecane borders the following municipalities: Nogarole Rocca, Povegliano Veronese, Roverbella, Valeggio sul Mincio, and Villafranca di Verona.

== Demographic evolution ==
Historical population

Year	Pop.	±%
1861	?	—
1871	1,787	—
1881	1,950	+9.1%
1901	1,962	+0.6%
1911	2,344	+19.5%

Year	Pop.	±%
1921	2,393	+2.1%
1931	2,729	+14.0%
1936	2,745	+0.6%
1951	2,964	+8.0%
1961	2,893	−2.4%

Year	Pop.	±%
1971	2,786	−3.7%
1981	3,592	+28.9%
1991	4,291	+19.5%
2001	4,949	+15.3%

Source: Data from ISTAT
