= Germans' Gate =

- Porte des Allemands
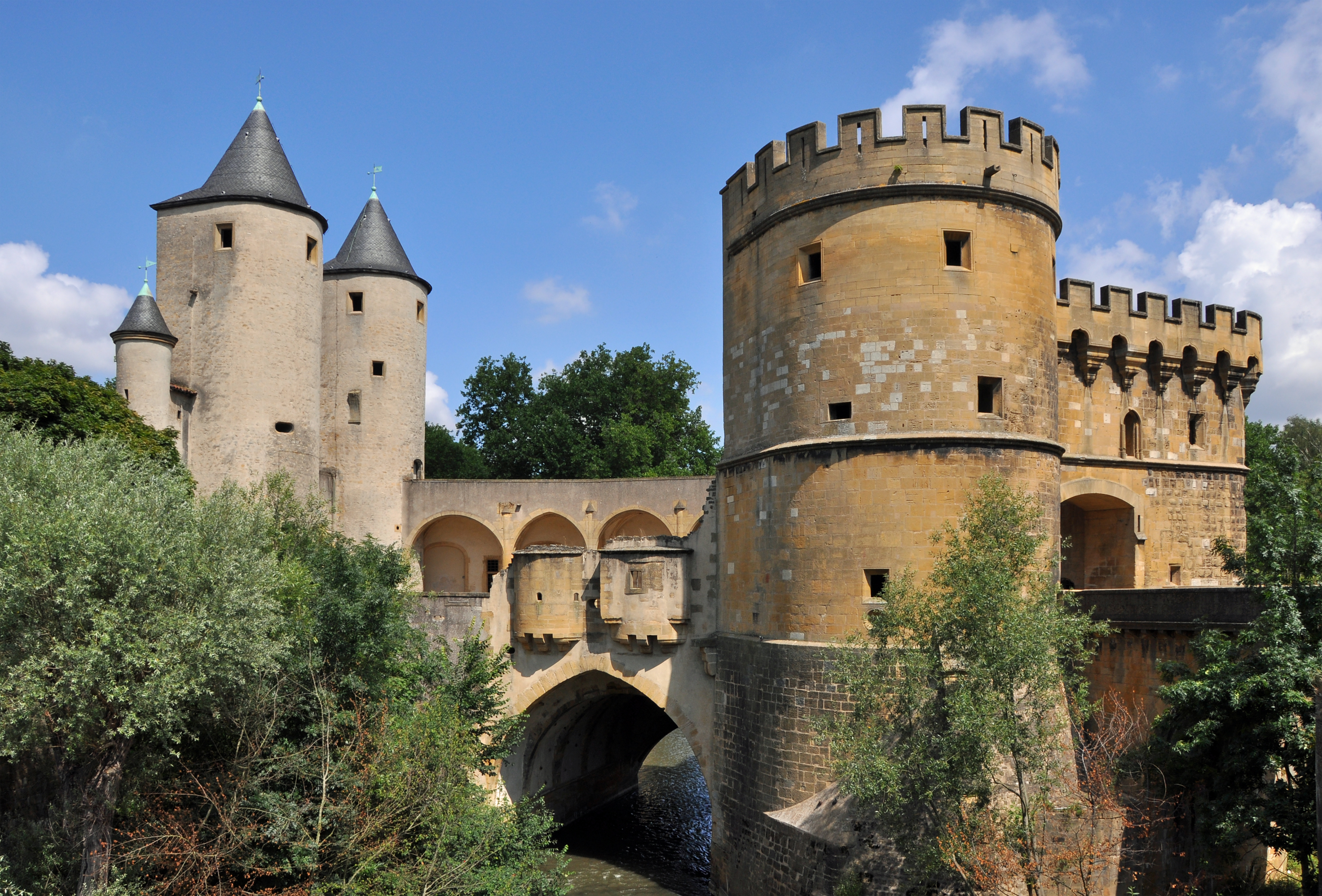
- Interactive map of the Germans' Gate area

General information
- Type: Bridge castle and city gate
- Location: Metz, France
- Coordinates: 49°07′04″N 06°11′08″E

Monument historique
- Designated: 1966
- Reference no.: PA00106837

The Germans' Gate (French: Porte des Allemands [pɔʁt dez‿almɑ̃]) is a medieval bridge castle and city gate in Metz, France. It is "a relic of the medieval fortifications, with two 13th century round towers and two gun bastions of the 15th century." It is a monument historique of France (list number: PA00106837).

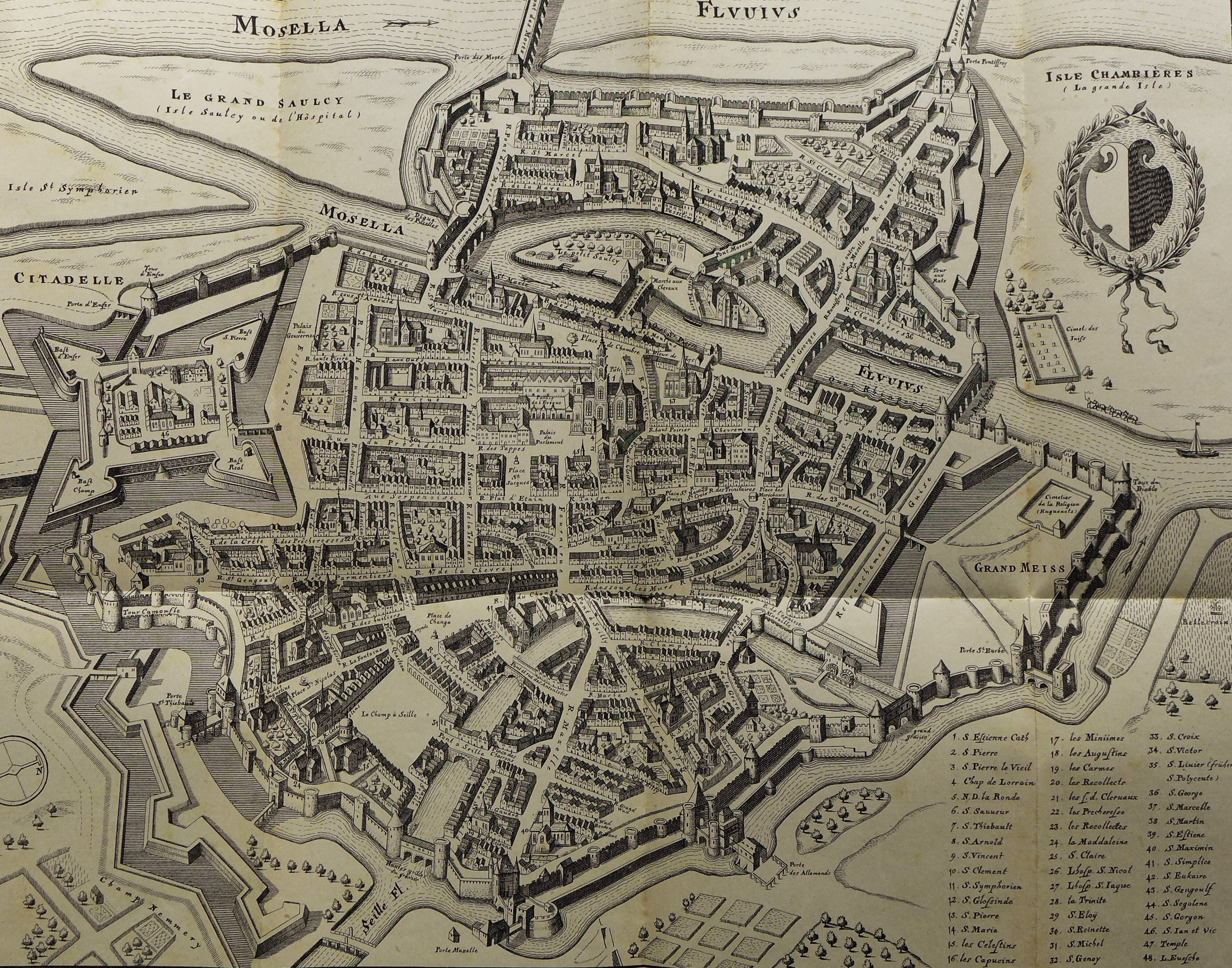
1652 map of Metz showing the Germans' Gate (Porte des Allemands) at lower right
