= Roverbella =

Roverbella Roarbèla (Emilian)
- Comune
- Comune di Roverbella
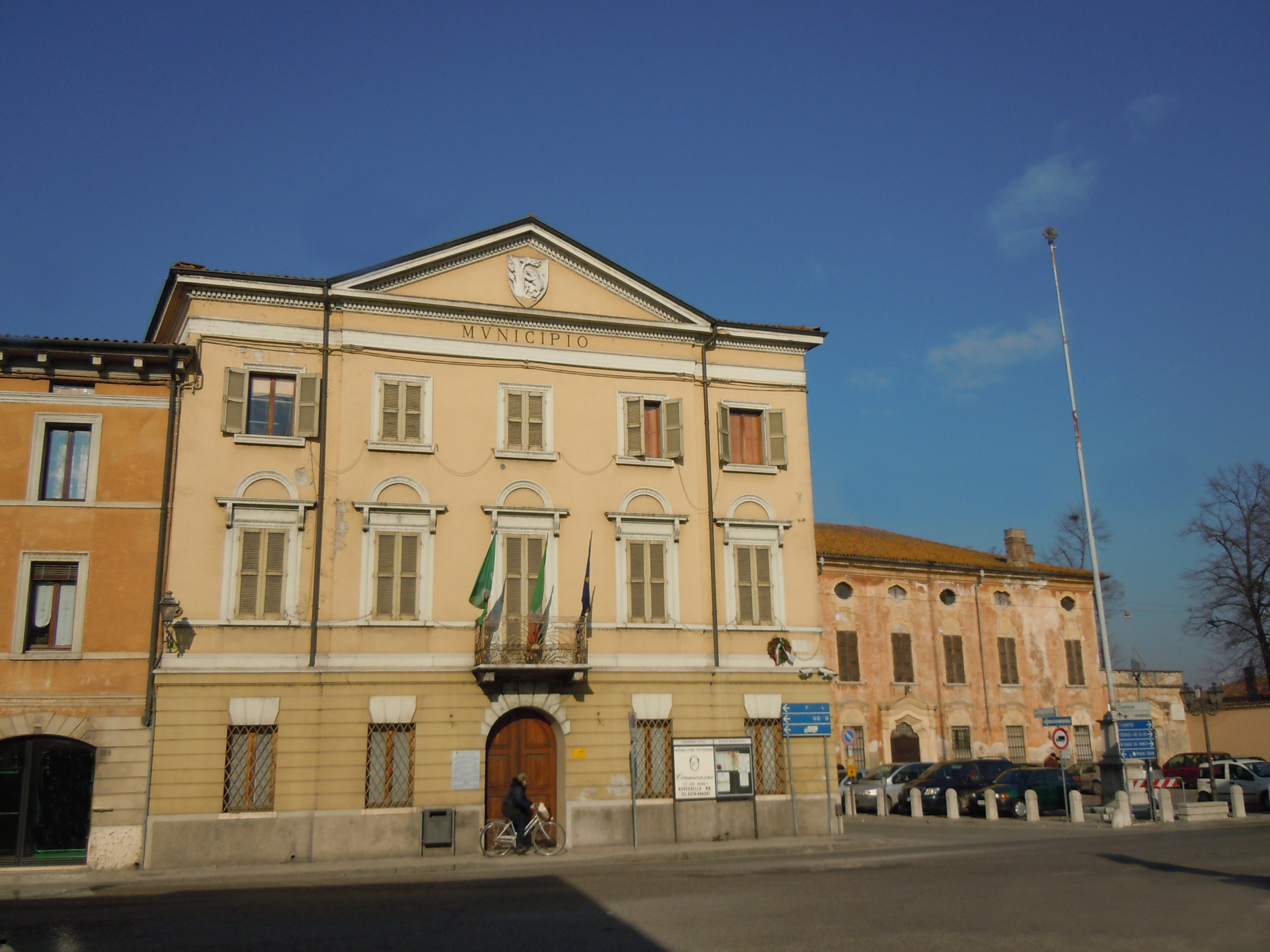

- Coat of arms

- Location within Italy Location within Lombardy
- Coordinates: 45°16′N 10°46′E
- Country: Italy
- Region: Lombardy
- Province: Mantua (MN)
- Frazioni: Belvedere, Ca' Mantovane, Canedole, Castiglione Mantovano, Malavicina, Pellaloco

Government
  - Mayor: Mattia Cortesi

Area
  - Total: 63.2 km^{2} (24.4 sq mi)
- Elevation: 47 m (154 ft)

Population (1 January 2009)
  - Total: 8,498
  - Density: 134/km^{2} (348/sq mi)
- Demonym: Roverbellesi
- Time zone: UTC+1 (CET)
  - Summer (DST): UTC+2 (CEST)
- Postal code: 46048
- Dialing code: 0376
- Website: Official website

Roverbella (Upper Mantovano: Roarbèla) is a comune (municipality) in the Province of Mantua in the Italian region Lombardy, located about 130 kilometres (81 mi) east of Milan and about 11 kilometres (7 mi) north of Mantua.

Roverbella borders the following municipalities: Castelbelforte, Marmirolo, Mozzecane, Nogarole Rocca, Porto Mantovano, San Giorgio di Mantova, Trevenzuolo, Valeggio sul Mincio.
