= Nogarole Rocca =

- Comune
- Comune di Nogarole Rocca
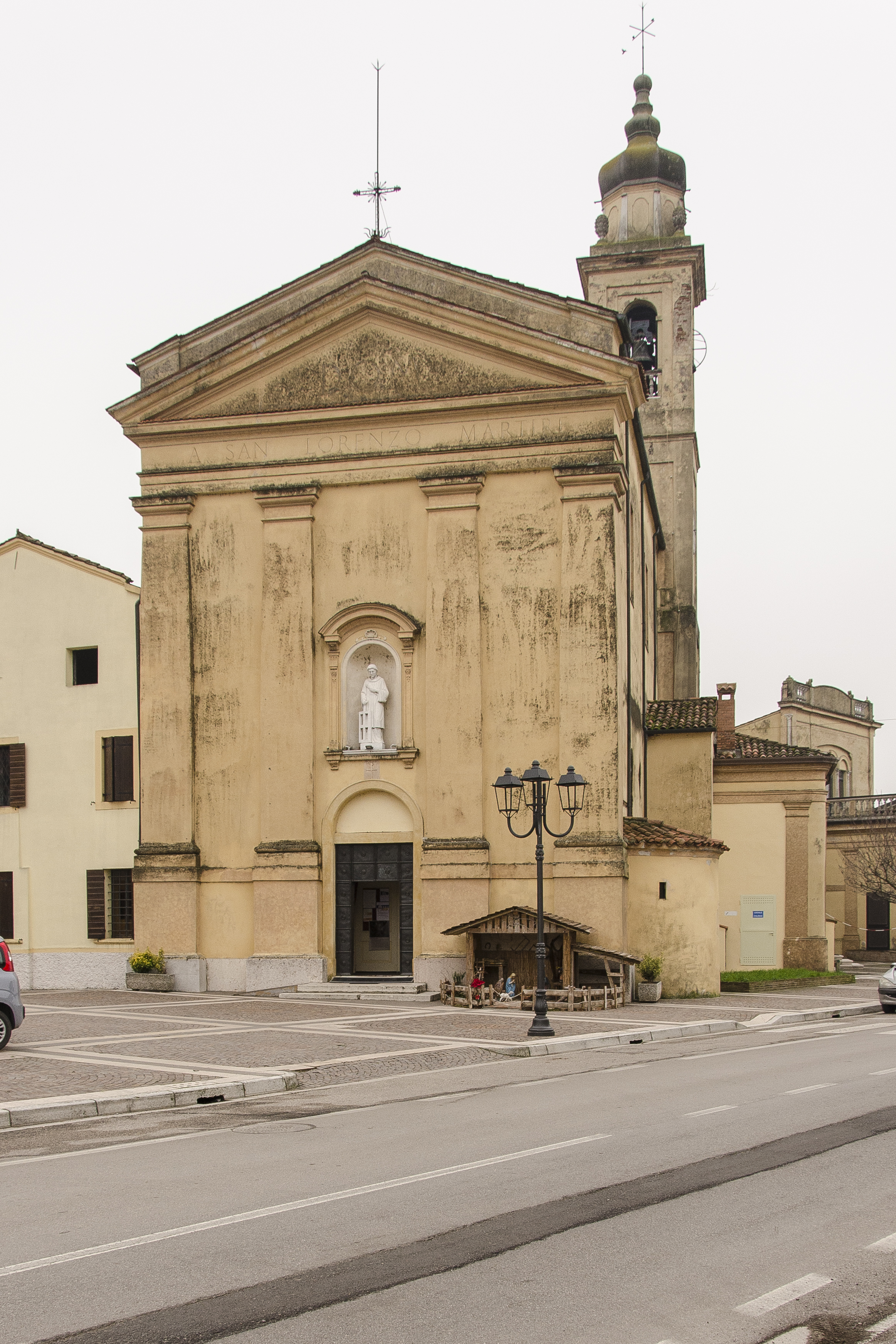
- San Lorenzo Martire church

- Location within Italy Location within Veneto
- Coordinates: 45°17′N 10°53′E
- Country: Italy
- Region: Veneto
- Province: Province of Verona (VR)
- Frazioni: Pradelle, Bagnolo

Area
  - Total: 29.2 km^{2} (11.3 sq mi)
- Elevation: 37 m (121 ft)

Population (Dec. 2004)
  - Total: 3,088
  - Density: 106/km^{2} (274/sq mi)
- Demonym: Nogarolesi
- Time zone: UTC+1 (CET)
  - Summer (DST): UTC+2 (CEST)
- Postal code: 37060
- Dialing code: 045
- Website: Official website

Nogarole Rocca is a comune (municipality) in the province of Verona, in the Italian region of Veneto, located about 110 kilometres (68 mi) west of Venice and about 20 kilometres (12 mi) southwest of Verona. As of 31 December 2004, it had a population of 3,088 and an area of 29.2 square kilometres (11.3 mi^{2}).

The municipality of Nogarole Rocca contains the frazioni (subdivisions, mainly villages and hamlets) Pradelle and Bagnolo.

Nogarole Rocca borders the following municipalities: Mozzecane, Povegliano Veronese, Roverbella, Trevenzuolo, and Vigasio.

== Demographic evolution ==
Historical population

Year	Pop.	±%
1861	?	—
1871	1,574	—
1881	1,611	+2.4%
1901	1,694	+5.2%
1911	2,397	+41.5%

Year	Pop.	±%
1921	2,748	+14.6%
1931	3,198	+16.4%
1936	3,417	+6.8%
1951	3,469	+1.5%
1961	2,619	−24.5%

Year	Pop.	±%
1971	2,310	−11.8%
1981	2,365	+2.4%
1991	2,676	+13.2%
2001	2,850	+6.5%

Source: Data from ISTAT
