= G. Ulrich Großmann =

German art historian

Georg Ulrich Großmann (29 November 1953) is a German art historian. He was general director of the Germanisches Nationalmuseum in Nuremberg.

== Life ==
Born in Marburg, Großmann studied art history, European ethnology and Christian archaeology at the Julius-Maximilians-Universität Würzburg and Philipps-Universität Marburg. In 1979 he received his doctorate in Marburg, with a dissertation Der Schlossbau 1530–1630 in Hessen. At the Detmold Open-air Museum he worked as an architectural historian from 1980 to 1986. In 1986 he was the founding director of the Weserrenaissance-Museum at Schloss Brake in Lemgo. Großmann was general director of the Germanisches Nationalmuseum in Nuremberg from 1994 until 2019, when he retired.

In 1994, he was habilitated at the University of Hanover in the Department of Architecture with a topic on historical building research, and in 1997 he was re-habilitated at the University of Bamberg in the history of art and architecture. He was initially a private lecturer in Bamberg; in 2001 he was appointed Außerplanmäßiger Professor there. The focus of his teaching is medieval art history.

Großmann has published works on historical building research, architecture, painting, book art and graphic art, writes art-historical travel guides and is active as an editor. He was chairman of the international working group for house research from 1982 to 2006, has been founding chairman of the Wartburg-Gesellschaft zur Erforschung von Burgen und Schlössern (Wartburg society for the research of castles and palaces) since 1992, serving until 2017. He has been vice president of the supporting association of the Deutsches Burgenmuseum Veste Heldburg from 2005. Since 1997, Großmann has been a member of the Historische Kommission für Hessen. From 2012 to 2016, he was president of the Comité International d'Histoire de l'Art (CIHA).

== Publications ==
=== Books ===
- Der Schlossbau in Hessen 1530–1630, Marburg 1979, DNB-IDN 820118826 (dissertation for the University of Marburg 1980, 267 pages).ISBN 978-3-7701-1436-8
- Östliches Westfalen: vom Hellweg zur Weser : Kunst und Kultur zwischen Soest und Paderborn, Minden und Warburg. Köln: DuMont Buchverlag, 1984. ISBN 978-3-7701-1436-8
- Adelshöfe in Westfalen (editor) . München: Deutscher Kunstverlag, 1989. ( Schriften des Weserrenaissance-Museums Schloss Brake, Bd. 3.)
- with G. Ulrich. Renaissance in Nord-Mitteleuropa I. München: Deutscher Kunstverlag, 1990. Series: Schriften des Weserrenaissance-Museums Schloss Brake, 4
- . Zur Bauforschung über Spätmittelalter und frühe Neuzeit. Marburg: Jonas Verlag, 1991. ISBN 978-3-89445-114-1 Berichte zur Haus- und Bauforschung, Bd. 1.
- Einführung in die historische Bauforschung. Wissenschaftliche Buchgesellschaft, Darmstadt 1993, ISBN 3-534-20772-6 (Habilitationsschrift, Hannover 1992/1994, 204 pages). According to WorldCat, the book is held in 126 WorldCat libraries
- Architektur und Museum – Bauwerk und Sammlung. Das Germanische Nationalmuseum und seine Architektur. Ostfildern 1997 (Kulturgeschichtliche Spaziergänge im Germanischen Nationalmuseum. Vol. 1) ISBN 978-3-7757-0719-0.
- Limburg an der Lahn: Führer durch die Stadt und ihre Geschichte. Marburg a.d. Lahn: Trautvetter & Fischer, 2000. Series: Dürer Forschungen, Bd. 2.
- Grossmann, G. Ulrich, and Hans-Heinrich Häffner. Burg Guttenberg am Neckar. Regensburg: Schnell & Steiner, 2007. Series: Burgen, Schlösser und Wehrbauten in Mitteleuropa, Bd. 16. ISBN 978-3-7954-1957-8
- with Thomas Eser, Anja Grebe, and Peggy Grosse. Buchmalerei der Dürerzeit: Dürer und die Mathematik : Neues aus der Dürerforschung. 2009.
- . Mythos Burg. Dresden: Sandstein, 2010. ISBN 978-3-936688-51-1 "Eine Ausstellung des Germanischen Nationalmuseums Nürnberg, 8. Juli bis 7. November 2010."
- with Hans Ottomeyer. Die Burg: wissenschaftlicher Begleitband zu den Ausstellungen "Burg und Herrschaft" und "Mythos Burg"; [Deutsches Historisches Museum, Berlin 25. Juni – 24. Oktober 2010; Germanisches Nationalmuseum, Nürnberg 8. Juli – 7. November 2010; Publikation der Beiträge des Symposions "Die Burg auf der Wartburg, 19. – 22. März 2009]. Dresden: Sandstein, 2010. " v. 1. Burg und Herrschaft.--v.2. Mythos Burg.--v.3. Die Burg: Wissenschaftlicher Begleitband zu den Ausstellungen "Burg und Herrschaft" und "Mythos Burg." "
- Fachwerkstraßen in Deutschland. Theiss, Stuttgart 2012, ISBN 978-3-8062-2416-0. "Burg, Band 3".
- Einführungen in Susann Kretschmar: Burgen in der Kunst. Nürnberg 2012 (Kulturgeschichtliche Spaziergänge im Germanischen Nationalmuseum. Vol. 13).
- Die Welt der Burgen. Geschichte, Architektur, Kultur. Beck, Munich 2013, ISBN 978-3-406-64510-5.
- International Congress of the History of Art, G. Ulrich Grossmann, and Petra Krutisch. eds. The challenge of the object: 33rd Congress of the International Committee of the History of Art, Nuremberg, 15–20 July 2012 = Die Herausforderung des Obdes Objects : 33. Internationaler Kunsthistoriker-Kongress, Nürnberg, 15–20 July 2012. Nürnberg: Verlag des Germanischen Nationalmuseums, 2013. Series: Wissenschaftliche Beibande zum Anzeiger des Germanischen Nationalmuseums, Bd. 31–32.1–4. ISBN 978-3-936688-64-1
