= Marmirolo =

Marmirolo Marmiröl (Emilian)
- Comune
- Comune di Marmirolo
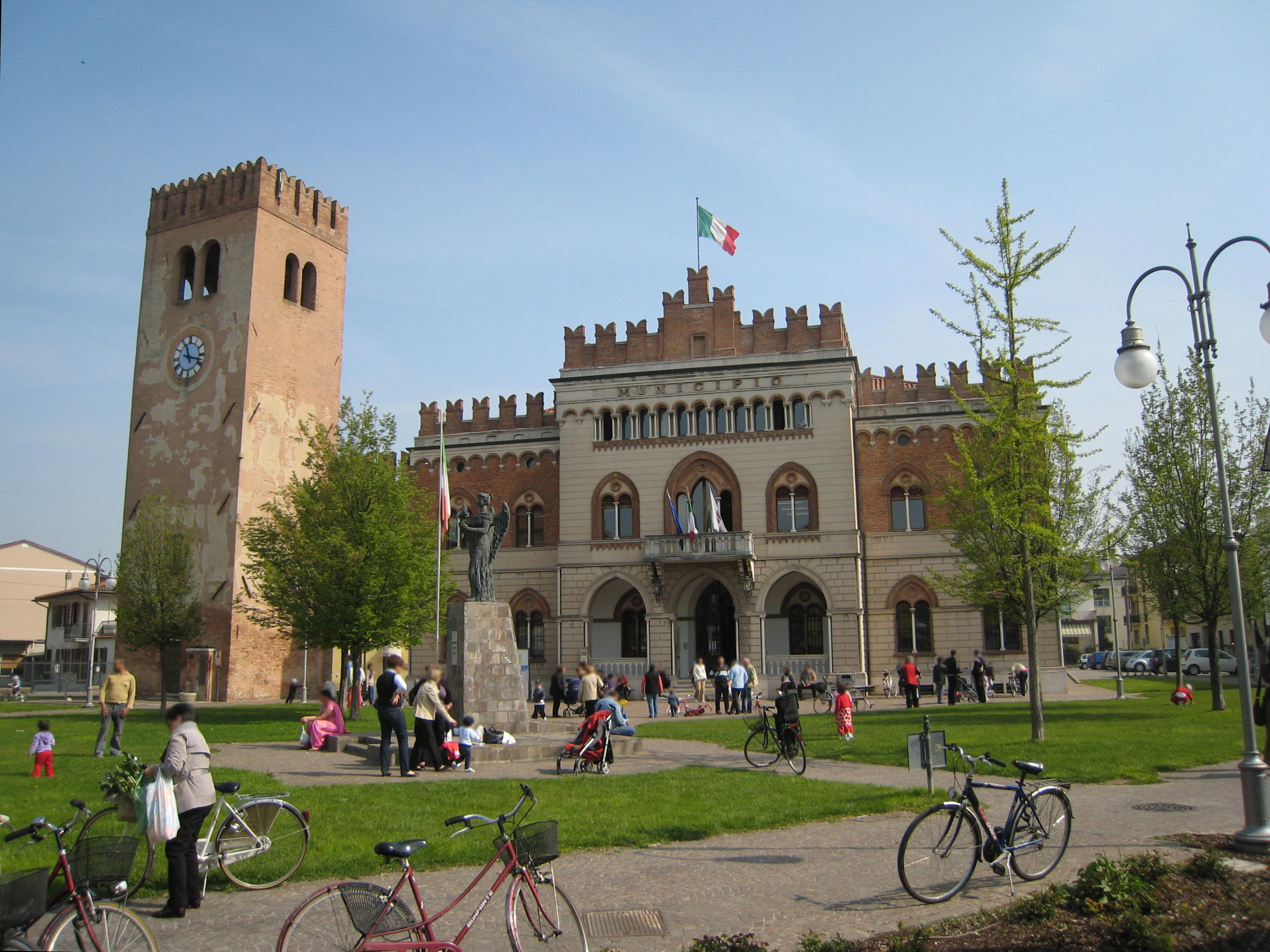

- Coat of arms

- Location within Italy Location within Lombardy
- Coordinates: 45°13′N 10°45′E
- Country: Italy
- Region: Lombardy
- Province: Mantua (MN)
- Frazioni: Marengo, Rotta, Pero, Pozzolo, San Brizio, Scaraglio

Government
  - Mayor: Paolo Galeotti

Area
  - Total: 42.02 km^{2} (16.22 sq mi)
- Elevation: 29 m (95 ft)

Population (28 February 2017)
  - Total: 7,805
  - Density: 185.7/km^{2} (481.1/sq mi)
- Demonym: Marmirolesi
- Time zone: UTC+1 (CET)
  - Summer (DST): UTC+2 (CEST)
- Postal code: 46045
- Dialing code: 0376
- Patron saint: St. Sebastian
- Saint day: January 20
- Website: Official website

Marmirolo (Mantovano: Marmiröl) is a comune (municipality) in the Province of Mantua in the Italian region Lombardy, located about 130 kilometres (81 mi) east of Milan and about 7 kilometres (4 mi) northwest of Mantua. Its territory, which is totally plain as part of the Pianura Padana, is crossed by the Mincio river.

Marmirolo borders the following municipalities: Goito, Porto Mantovano, Roverbella, Valeggio sul Mincio, Volta Mantovana.

== History ==
Marmirolo is mentioned for the first time in 970, and was a possession of the Canossa family. In 1055 it was acquired by the commune of Mantua by an imperial diplom. Later it was ruled by the House of Gonzaga, who hold it from 1328 until 1707. Here Gianfrancesco Gonzaga built a castle in 1435, enlarged in 1480 under design by Luca Fancelli and later finished by architect Giulio Romano in 1539. This edifice was however destroyed in 1798.

Napoleon make his quarters at Marmirolo in July 1796. Where he writes Josephine, "When shall I, free from all disturbance and care, pass all my moments with you, and have nothing to do but to love, nothing to think of but the happiness to tell it and prove it to you?" Two days later Napoleon writes again from Marmirolo, "We attacked Mantua yesterday. We opened upon it, from two batteries, a fire of shells and red-hot balls. The whole night the unfortunate city was burning. The spectacle was terrible and sublime. We have taken possession of numerous outworks, and we open trenches to-night. To-morrow we make our headquarters at Castiglione, and think of passing the night there."

Near the town is the Gonzaga hunting lodge of Palazzina Gonzaghesca di Bosco Fontana.

== Twin towns ==
Marmirolo is twinned with:

- Massa Lombarda, Italy
