= Valeggio sul Mincio =

Valeggio sul Mincio Vałézo sol Menzo (Venetian)
- Comune
- Comune di Valeggio sul Mincio
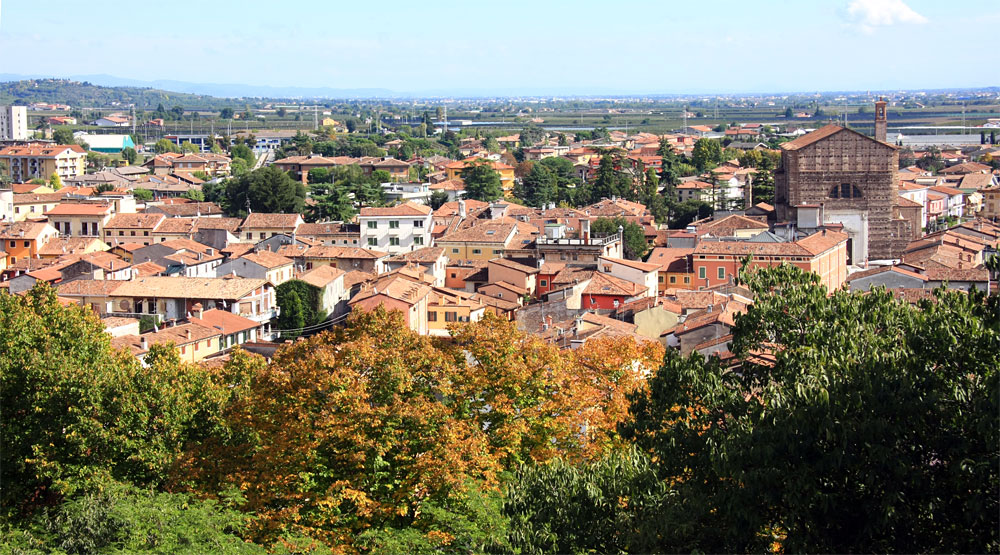

- Coat of arms

- Location within Italy Location within Veneto
- Coordinates: 45°21′N 10°44′E
- Country: Italy
- Region: Veneto
- Province: Verona (VR)
- Frazioni: Salionze, Borghetto, Vanoni e Remelli

Government
  - Mayor: Angelo Tosoni

Area
  - Total: 63.9 km^{2} (24.7 sq mi)
- Elevation: 88 m (289 ft)

Population (31 October 2009)
  - Total: 14,155
  - Density: 222/km^{2} (574/sq mi)
- Demonym: Valeggiani
- Time zone: UTC+1 (CET)
  - Summer (DST): UTC+2 (CEST)
- Postal code: 37067, 37060
- Dialing code: 045
- Patron saint: St. George
- Saint day: 23 April
- Website: Official website

Valeggio sul Mincio (Venetian: Vałézo sol Menzo) is a commune in the Province of Verona, region of Veneto, Italy, located about 120 kilometres (75 mi) west of Venice and about 25 kilometres (16 mi) southwest of Verona. It is crossed by the Mincio river. Its frazione of Borghetto is one of I Borghi più belli d'Italia ("The most beautiful villages of Italy").

The economy is mostly based on agriculture, with some craftwork and industrial production. Valeggio sul Mincio borders the following municipalities: Castelnuovo del Garda, Marmirolo, Monzambano, Mozzecane, Peschiera del Garda, Ponti sul Mincio, Roverbella, Sommacampagna, Sona, Villafranca di Verona, and Volta Mantovana.

== History ==
Archaeological excavations in the Mincio valley include a Bronze Age settlement, some tombs dating to the Iron Age and some findings associated with the Etruscan civilization. During the work of river channelling in 1955–56 at Isolone della Prevaldesca (an area near Valeggio) a pile-dwelling settlement came to light which led to the collection of 16,000 finds; some tombs and other finds dating to the Iron Age were found in Borghetto (in 1933 a metallic urn dating to the First Iron Age was found) and some finds associated with the Etruscan civilization (ornaments and jewellery were found in the Mincio Valley). A large Celtic necropolis, found in 1984 still partly buried under the current town, would prove the presence of that people from the 4th century BCE and the 1st century CE. In the necropolis were also discovered finds and marble funeral monuments from Roman times, as well as traces of traffic connections linking the ford on the river to consular roads.

The creation of the villages of Valeggio and Borghetto dates to the Lombard rule in Northern Italy because their names derive from 'flat place' and 'fortified settlement' respectively. The monastery of Santa Maria was founded here, on the banks of the Mincio, in the 12th century; later it was a priory of the Knights Templar. The large medieval fortifications which characterize Valeggio (Scaliger castle, the Visconti Bridge and the Serraglio defensive line) were built between the 13th and the 14th centuries. In 1405 Valeggio became part of the Republic of Venice, and subsequently lost its strategic role, becoming an agricultural center and a silkworms trading market.

After the fall of the Republic of Venice in 1797, Valeggio was included in the Cisalpine Republic. Later it was part of the Italian Republic (1802-1805) and then of the Kingdom of Italy. With Napoleon’s fall, the Congress of Vienna established the entrance of Valeggio in the Kingdom of Lombardy–Venetia, an Austrian Empire dependence. During the Italian Unification (the 'Risorgimento'), the town was a protagonist of the battles of the First, Second and Third Italian War of Independence, which led to the creation of the newly unified Kingdom of Italy.

In World War II, on 14 February 1944, an American aircraft B-17 fell during a dogfight in the locality of Vanoni-Remelli, causing the death of pilot Harold Arthur Bond Jr. and a civilian who was working in the fields near a water canal. Monte Borghetto, on 4 December 1944, was bombarded. The true aim for the attack was the Visconti Bridge.

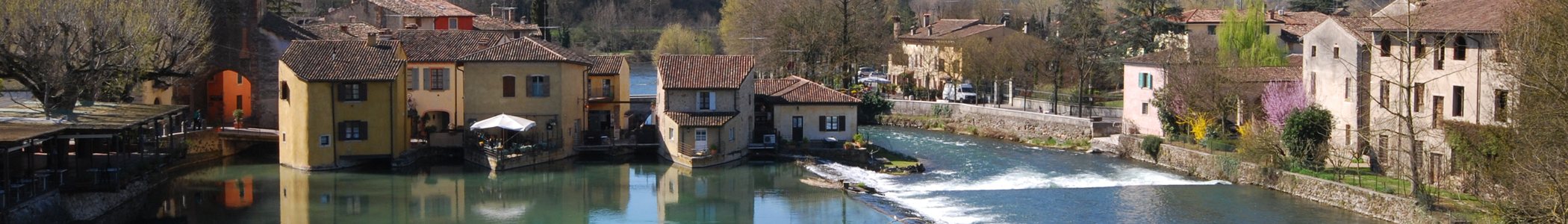
View of the town from across the Mincio river

== Main sights ==
- Borghetto, a frazione with the Ponte Visconteo ("Visconti Bridge"), a fortified dam built in 1393 by Gian Galeazzo Visconti, Duke of Milan. The bridge is 650 m long and 25 m wide. It was connected to the nearby Scaliger Castle by two tall merloned walls, and integrated in the fortified complex known as Serraglio which extended for c. 16 km in the Veronese plain up to Nogarole Rocca.
- Villa Maffei Sigurtà, built in 1690.
- Tortellini were created in Valeggio sul Mincio.
- San Pietro In Cattedra: neoclassical church.
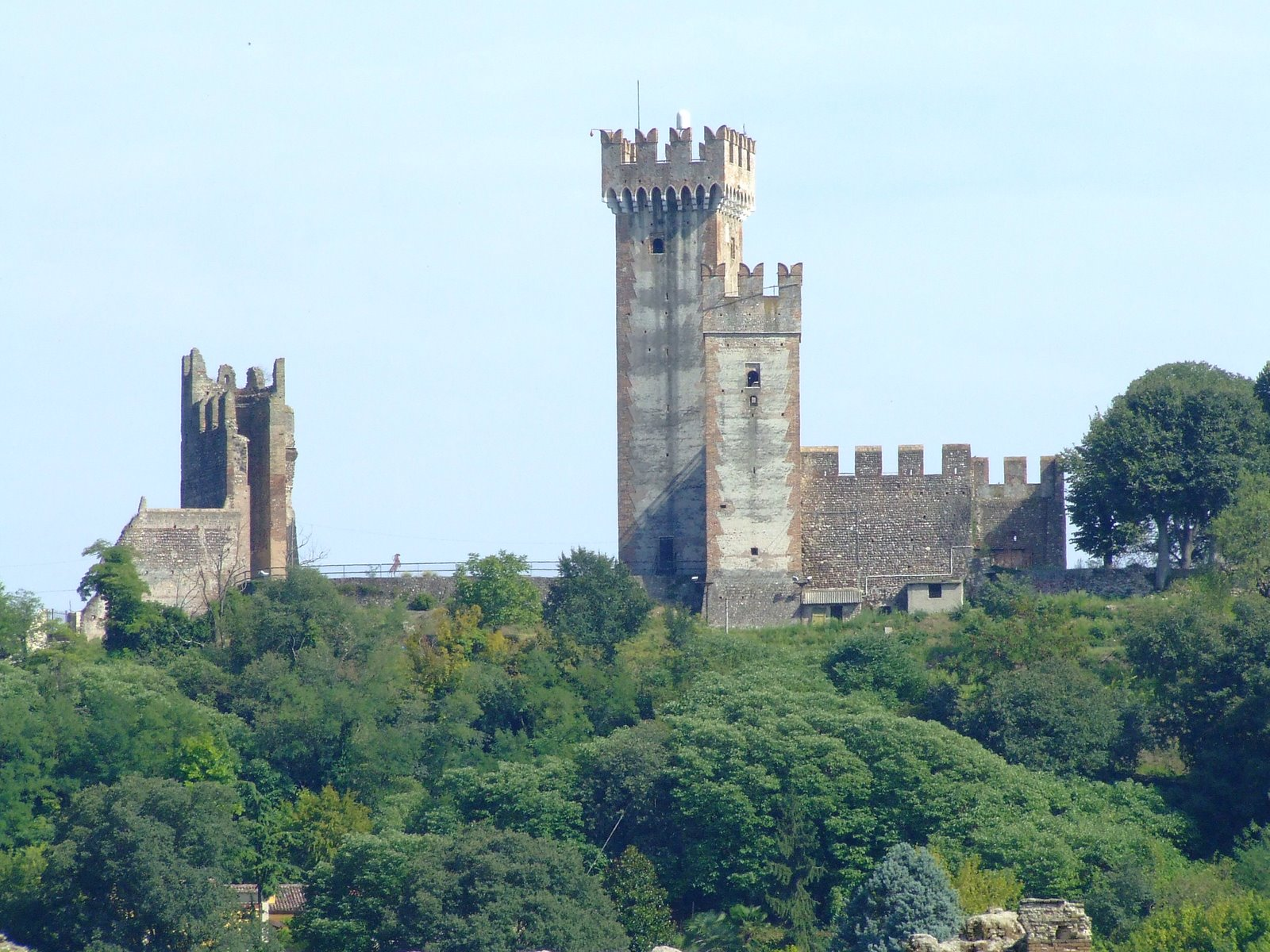
Scaliger Castle

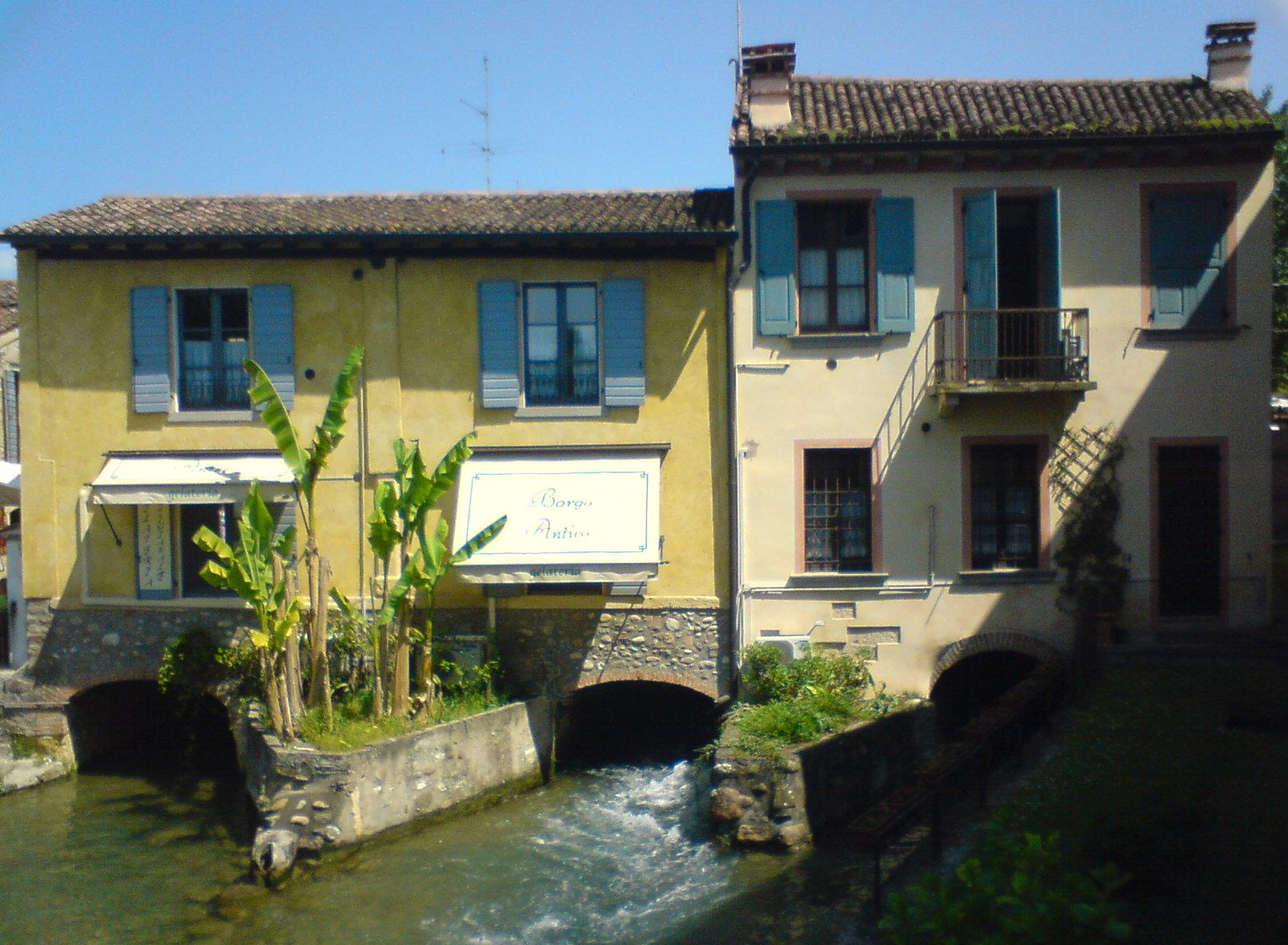
Buildings in the old town

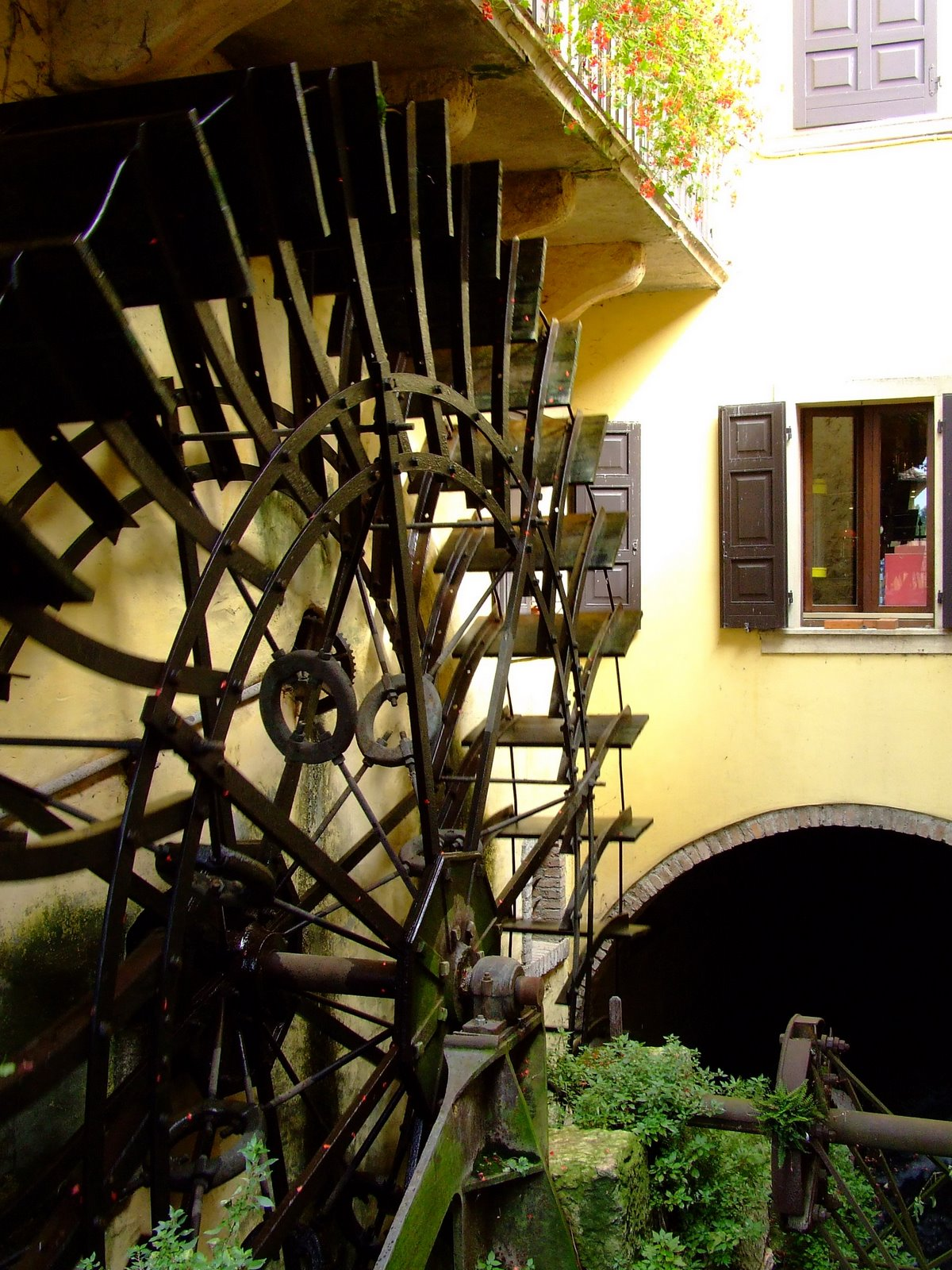
Water mill in the old town

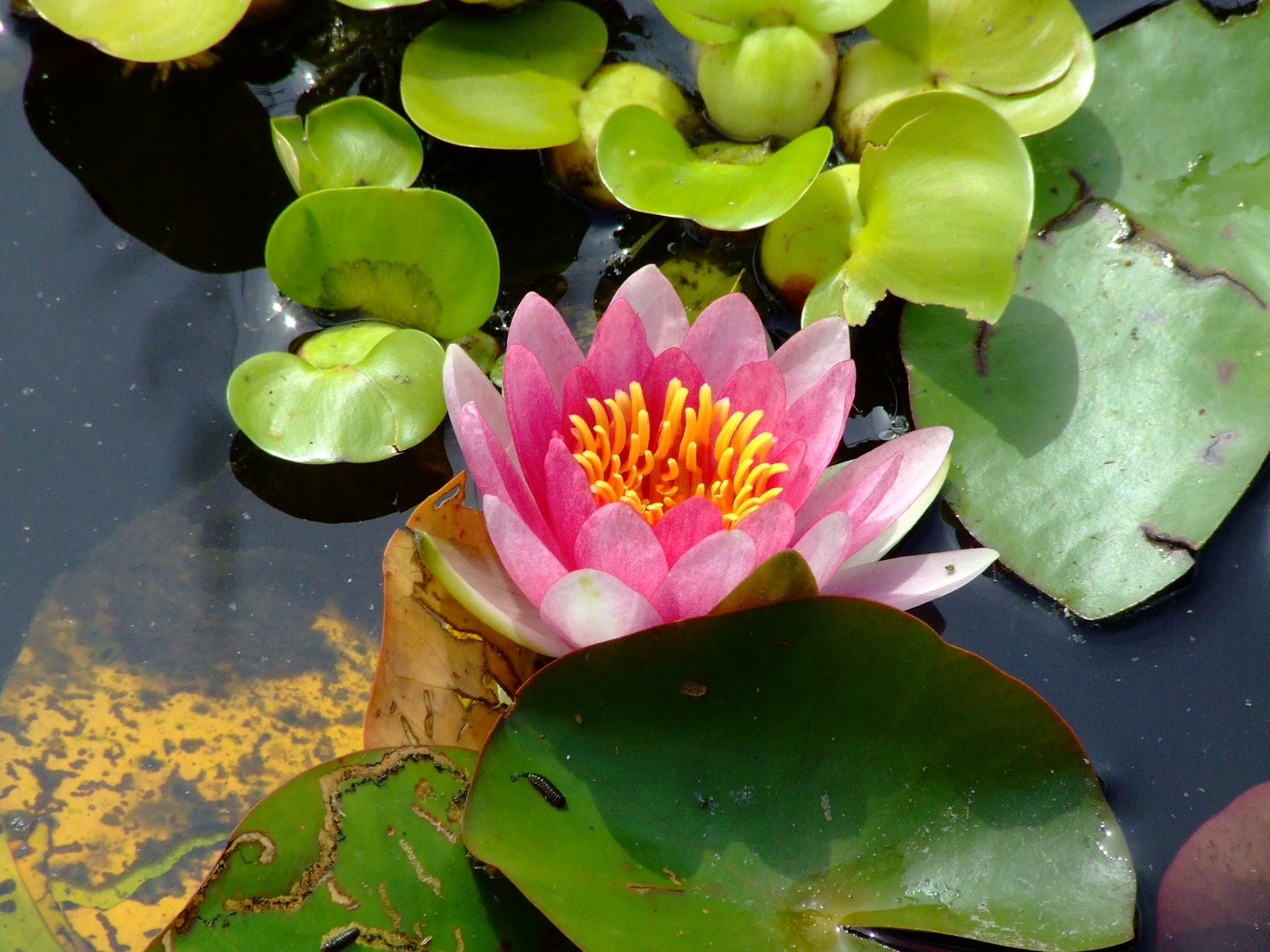
Water plants in Parco Giardino Sigurtà

== Twin towns ==
- Ichenhausen, Germany
- St. Johann in Tirol, Austria
