= Trevenzuolo =

- Comune
- Comune di Trevenzuolo
- Location within Italy Location within Veneto
- Coordinates: 45°16′N 10°55′E
- Country: Italy
- Region: Veneto
- Province: Verona (VR)
- Frazioni: Fagnano, Roncolevà

Area
  - Total: 26.98 km^{2} (10.42 sq mi)
- Elevation: 31 m (102 ft)

Population (1 June 2007)
  - Total: 2,628
  - Density: 97.41/km^{2} (252.3/sq mi)
- Demonym: Trevenzuolesi
- Time zone: UTC+1 (CET)
  - Summer (DST): UTC+2 (CEST)
- Postal code: 37060
- Dialing code: 045
- ISTAT code: 023088
- Saint day: 18 July

Trevenzuolo is a comune with 2,431 inhabitants in the province of Verona. A Roman bronze figure of a lady was found in the village in the nineteenth century and is now in the British Museum.
