= List of railway stations in Veneto =

This is the list of the railway stations in Veneto owned by:

- Rete Ferroviaria Italiana (RFI), a branch of the Italian state company Ferrovie dello Stato;
- Sistemi Territoriali (ST).

== RFI stations ==
Station	Locality	Province	Category
Abano Terme	Abano Terme	Padua (Padova)	Bronze
Adria	Adria	Rovigo	Silver
Alano-Fener-Valdobbiadene	Alano di Piave	Belluno	Bronze
Albaredo	Albaredo	Treviso	Bronze
Altavilla-Tavernelle	Altavilla Vicentina	Vicenza	Silver
Anconetta	Vicenza	Vicenza	Bronze
Annone Veneto	Annone Veneto	Venice (Venezia)	Bronze
Arquà	Arquà Polesine	Rovigo	Bronze
Badia Polesine	Badia Polesine	Rovigo	Bronze
Baricetta	Baricetta	Rovigo	Bronze
Bassano del Grappa	Bassano del Grappa	Vicenza	Silver
Battaglia Terme	Battaglia Terme	Padua (Padova)	Silver
Belluno	Belluno	Belluno	Silver
Bevilacqua	Bevilacqua	Verona	Bronze
Bonferraro	Bonferraro	Verona	Bronze
Boschi Sant'Anna	Boschi Sant'Anna	Verona	Bronze
Bovolone	Bovolone	Verona	Bronze
Busche-Lentiai-Mel	Busche	Belluno	Bronze
Buttapietra	Buttapietra	Verona	Bronze
Calalzo-Pieve Cadore-Cortina	Calalzo di Cadore	Belluno	Silver
Caldiero	Caldiero	Verona	Silver
Campodarsego	Campodarsego	Padua (Padova)	Silver
Camposampiero	Camposampiero	Padua (Padova)	Silver
Canaro	Canaro	Rovigo	Bronze
Carmignano di Brenta	Carmignano di Brenta	Padua (Padova)	Bronze
Carpanè-Valstagna	Carpanè	Vicenza	Bronze
Cassola	Cassola	Vicenza	Bronze
Castagnaro	Castagnaro	Verona	Bronze
Castelfranco Veneto	Castelfranco Veneto	Treviso	Gold
Castello di Godego	Castello di Godego	Treviso	Silver
Castelnuovo del Garda	Castelnuovo del Garda	Verona	Bronze
Cavanella d'Adige	Cavanella d'Adige	Venice (Venezia)	Bronze
Cavazzale	Cavazzale	Vicenza	Bronze
Ceggia	Ceggia	Venice (Venezia)	Bronze
Cerea	Cerea	Verona	Bronze
Ceregnano	Ceregnano	Rovigo	Bronze
Chioggia	Chioggia	Venice (Venezia)	Bronze
Cismon del Grappa	Cismon del Grappa	Vicenza	Bronze
Cittadella	Cittadella	Padua (Padova)	Silver
Conegliano	Conegliano	Treviso	Silver
Cornuda	Cornuda	Treviso	Silver
Costa	Costa di Rovigo	Rovigo	Bronze
Dolcè	Dolcè	Verona	Bronze
Dolo	Dolo	Venice (Venezia)	Silver
Domegliara-Sant'Ambrogio	Domegliara	Verona	Silver
Dossobuono	Dossobuono	Verona	Silver
Dueville	Dueville	Vicenza	Silver
Este	Este	Padua (Padova)	Silver
Faè-Fortogna	Faè	Belluno	Bronze
Fagarè	Fagarè	Treviso	Bronze
Fanzolo	Fanzolo	Treviso	Bronze
Feltre	Feltre	Belluno	Silver
Fontaniva	Fontaniva	Padua (Padova)	Bronze
Fossalta di Piave	Fossalta di Piave	Venice (Venezia)	Bronze
Fratta	Fratta Polesine	Rovigo	Bronze
Fratte Centro	Fratte	Padua (Padova)	Bronze
Gaggio Porta Est	Gaggio di Marcon	Venice (Venezia)	Bronze
Galliera Veneta-Tombolo	Galliera Veneta	Padua (Padova)	Bronze
Gorgo al Monticano	Gorgo al Monticano	Treviso	Bronze
Grisignano di Zocco	Grisignano di Zocco	Vicenza	Silver
Isola della Scala	Isola della Scala	Verona	Silver
Istrana	Istrana	Treviso	Silver
Lama	Lama	Rovigo	Bronze
Lancenigo	Lancenigo	Treviso	Silver
Legnago	Legnago	Verona	Silver
Lendinara	Lendinara	Rovigo	Bronze
Lerino	Lerino	Vicenza	Silver
Levada	Levada	Treviso	Bronze
Lison	Lison	Venice (Venezia)	Bronze
Longarone-Zoldo	Longarone	Belluno	Bronze
Lonigo	Lonigo	Vicenza	Silver
Loreo	Loreo	Rovigo	Bronze
Maerne di Martellago	Maerne di Martellago	Venice (Venezia)	Silver
Marano Vicentino	Marano Vicentino	Vicenza	Bronze
Meolo	Meolo	Venice (Venezia)	Silver
Mestrino	Mestrino	Padua (Padova)	Silver
Mira-Mirano	Mira	Venice (Venezia)	Silver
Mogliano Veneto	Mogliano Veneto	Treviso	Silver
Monselice	Monselice	Padua (Padova)	Silver
Montagnana	Montagnana	Padua (Padova)	Silver
Montebello	Montebello Vicentino	Vicenza	Silver
Montebelluna	Montebelluna	Treviso	Silver
Motta di Livenza	Motta di Livenza	Treviso	Bronze
Mozzecane	Mozzecane	Verona	Bronze
Noale-Scorzè	Noale	Venice (Venezia)	Silver
Nogara	Nogara	Verona	Silver
Occhiobello	Occhiobello	Rovigo	Bronze
Oderzo	Oderzo	Treviso	Bronze
Olmi-Spercenigo	Olmi San Floriano	Treviso	Bronze
Orsago	Orsago	Treviso	Bronze
Ospedaletto Euganeo	Ospedaletto Euganeo	Padua (Padova)	Bronze
Ospitale di Cadore	Ospitale di Cadore	Belluno	Bronze
Padova	Padova	Padua (Padova)	Platinum
Paese	Paese	Treviso	Bronze
Paese-Castagnole	Paese	Treviso	Bronze
Pederobba-Cavaso-Possagno	Pederobba	Treviso	Bronze
Perarolo di Cadore	Perarolo di Cadore	Belluno	Bronze
Peri	Peri	Verona	Bronze
Peschiera del Garda	Peschiera del Garda	Verona	Gold
Pianzano	Pianzano	Treviso	Silver
Piombino Dese	Piombino Dese	Padua (Padova)	Silver
Polesella	Polesella	Rovigo	Bronze
Ponte di Brenta	Padova	Padua (Padova)	Bronze
Ponte di Piave	Ponte di Piave	Treviso	Bronze
Ponte nelle Alpi-Polpet	Ponte nelle Alpi	Belluno	Silver
Portogruaro-Caorle	Portogruaro	Venice (Venezia)	Silver
Postioma	Postioma	Treviso	Bronze
Preganziol	Preganziol	Treviso	Silver
Primolano	Primolano	Vicenza	Bronze
Quarto d'Altino	Quarto d'Altino	Venice (Venezia)	Silver
Quero-Vas	Quero	Belluno	Bronze
Resana	Resana	Treviso	Bronze
Rosà	Rosà	Vicenza	Bronze
Rosolina	Rosolina	Rovigo	Bronze
Rossano Veneto	Rossano Veneto	Vicenza	Bronze
Rovigo	Rovigo	Rovigo	Gold
Sant'Anna di Chioggia	Sant'Anna di Chioggia	Venice (Venezia)	Bronze
San Biagio di Callalta	San Biagio di Callalta	Treviso	Bronze
San Bonifacio	San Bonifacio	Verona	Silver
Santa Croce del Lago	Santa Croce del Lago	Belluno	Bronze
San Donà di Piave-Jesolo	San Donà di Piave	Venice (Venezia)	Silver
Sant'Elena-Este	Sant'Elena	Padua (Padova)	Bronze
San Giorgio delle Pertiche	San Giorgio delle Pertiche	Padua (Padova)	Bronze
Santa Giustina-Cesio	Santa Giustina	Belluno	Bronze
San Marino	San Marino	Vicenza	Bronze
San Martino Buon Albergo	San Martino Buon Albergo	Verona	Bronze
San Martino di Lupari	San Martino di Lupari	Padua (Padova)	Bronze
San Nazario	San Nazario	Vicenza	Bronze
San Pietro in Gu	San Pietro in Gu	Padua (Padova)	Bronze
Santo Stino di Livenza	Santo Stino di Livenza	Venice (Venezia)	Silver
San Trovaso	San Trovaso	Treviso	Silver
Saletto	Saletto	Padua (Padova)	Bronze
Salzano-Robegano	Salzano	Venice (Venezia)	Silver
Sanguinetto	Sanguinetto	Verona	Bronze
Schio	Schio	Vicenza	Silver
Sedico-Bribano	Sedico	Belluno	Bronze
Soffratta	Vittorio Veneto	Treviso	Bronze
Solagna	Solagna	Vicenza	Bronze
Spinea	Spinea	Venice (Venezia)	Silver
Spresiano	Spresiano	Treviso	Silver
Stanghella	Stanghella	Padua (Padova)	Bronze
Stazione per l'Alpago	La Secca	Belluno	Bronze
Susegana	Susegana	Treviso	Silver
Teglio Veneto	Teglio Veneto	Venice (Venezia)	Bronze
Terme Euganee-Abano-Montegrotto	Montegrotto Terme	Padua (Padova)	Silver
Thiene	Thiene	Vicenza	Silver
Trebaseleghe	Trebaseleghe	Padua (Padova)	Bronze
Trevignano-Signoressa	Trevignano	Treviso	Bronze
Treviso Centrale	Treviso	Treviso	Gold
Venezia Carpenedo	Venezia	Venice (Venezia)	Bronze
Venezia Mestre Ospedale	Venezia	Venice (Venezia)	Silver
Venezia Mestre	Venezia	Venice (Venezia)	Gold
Venezia Porto Marghera	Venezia	Venice (Venezia)	Silver
Venezia Santa Lucia	Venezia	Venice (Venezia)	Platinum
Verona Porta Nuova	Verona	Verona	Platinum
Verona Porta Vescovo	Verona	Verona	Silver
Vicenza	Vicenza	Vicenza	Gold
Vigodarzere	Vigodarzere	Padua (Padova)	Bronze
Vigonza-Pianiga	Vigonza	Padua (Padova)	Silver
Villa del Conte	Villa del Conte	Padua (Padova)	Bronze
Villabartolomea	Villa Bartolomea	Verona	Bronze
Villafranca di Verona	Villafranca di Verona	Verona	Silver
Villaverla-Montecchio	Villaverla	Vicenza	Bronze
Vittorio Veneto	Vittorio Veneto	Treviso	Silver

== ST stations ==
Station	Locality	Province
Arzergrande	Arzergrande	Padua (Padova)
Bojon	Campolongo Maggiore	Venice (Venezia)
Campagna Lupia-Camponogara	Camponogara	Venice (Venezia)
Campolongo Maggiore	Campolongo Maggiore	Venice (Venezia)
Casello 8	Campagna Lupia	Venice (Venezia)
Casello 11	Camponogara	Venice (Venezia)
Cavarzere	Cavarzere	Venice (Venezia)
Cavarzere Centro	Cavarzere	Venice (Venezia)
Cona Veneta	Cona	Venice (Venezia)
Mira Buse	Mira	Venice (Venezia)
Oriago	Mira	Venice (Venezia)
Piove di Sacco	Piove di Sacco	Padua (Padova)
Pontelongo Fermata	Pontelongo	Padua (Padova)
Venezia Mestre Porta Ovest	Mira	Venice (Venezia)

== See also ==
- Railway stations in Italy
- Ferrovie dello Stato
- Rail transport in Italy
- High-speed rail in Italy
- Transport in Italy
