= Verona–Bologna railway =

Key northern Italian transport link

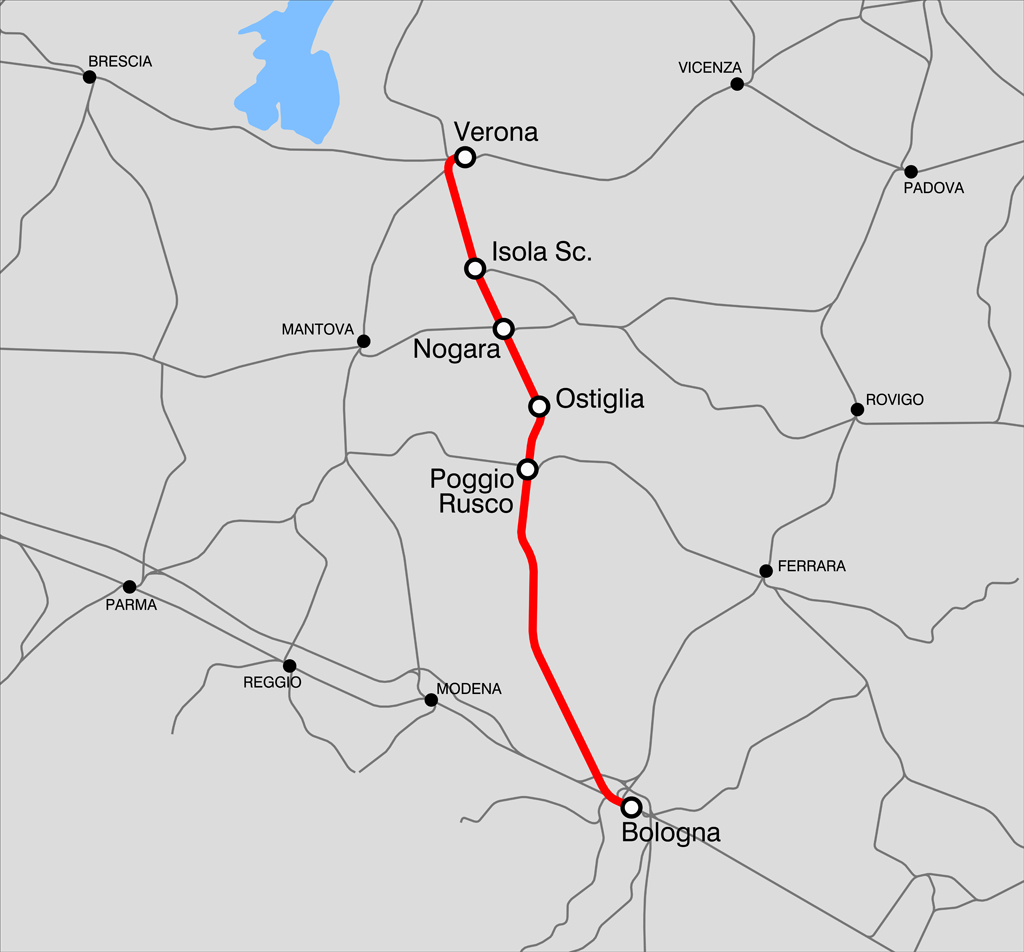
- Map of the railway line

The Verona–Bologna railway is a major Italian railway connecting Verona and Bologna and part of the major axis from the Brenner railway to the Bologna–Florence and on to Rome. The line is part of the Line 1 of Trans-European Transport Networks (TEN-T). It is considered a "fundamental" line by the state railways Ferrovie dello Stato (FS).

The railway infrastructure is controlled and managed by Rete Ferroviaria Italiana a subsidiary of FS. After being single track for most of its length for almost all of its history, in recent years it has been progressively duplicated; this was completed on 26 July 2009 with the opening of the second track between the crossover at P.C. Ostiglia Nord and Poggio Rusco station.

== History ==
=== Planning and construction from Bologna to Poggio Rusco ===
The railway line was conceived in the late 1870s as the main line between Verona and Bologna to replace the line via Mantua and Modena completed in 1875. The project was listed as a third-class railway in the Baccarini Law of 1879. The railway was built by the Società per le Strade Ferrate Meridionali (Italian Company for the Southern Railways, SFM) on behalf of the government, while the provinces that it crossed contributed 20 per cent of the construction costs.

Originally it was intended that the railway would be built entirely of double track and it was built as such between Tavernelle d'Emilia and Bologna. Difficulties in the construction of the embankment near San Felice sul Panaro and the presence of numerous aquifers along the way which made the terrain over which the line had to pass unstable caused its continuation to be built as a single track. The line was opened from Bologna to San Giovanni in Persiceto on 7 April 1887 and extended to Crevalcore on 9 June 1888 and San Felice on 22 October 1889.

During those same years, the trunk line between San Felice and Verona Porta Nuova station was the subject of bitter controversy. The original project designed by the engineers Minarelli and Jean Louis Protche and approved by the legislature, was routed through Poggio Rusco. However the town of Mirandola supported a variation proposed by the engineer Gabelli that diverted the line closer to the town of Modena. Protche and Minarelli's route was finally confirmed in May 1887. As a result, the Suzzara–Ferrara railway company started construction only a few weeks later of a variation of the project that allowed it to join the Verona-Bologna line at a future station in the town of Poggio Rusco. The station was so constructed and opened on 1 July 1888 even before the concession for the line from San Felice was granted.

Following the financial crisis of the 1890s work proceeded slowly and Poggio Rusco was reached on 20 January 1902. The new trunk was operated from its opening with electric traction, using accumulator railcars. Indeed, from 1 May 1901 the SFM began to operate this type of traction between San Felice and Bologna, extending to the new concession when it was opened for operation. Four rail cars were constructed by Diatto with two Ganz 30 kW electric motors, and with 52 seats. They were numbered RA 001-004 and could reach speeds of 60 km/h. The trial ended in 1903.

=== Construction from Poggio Rusco to Verona ===
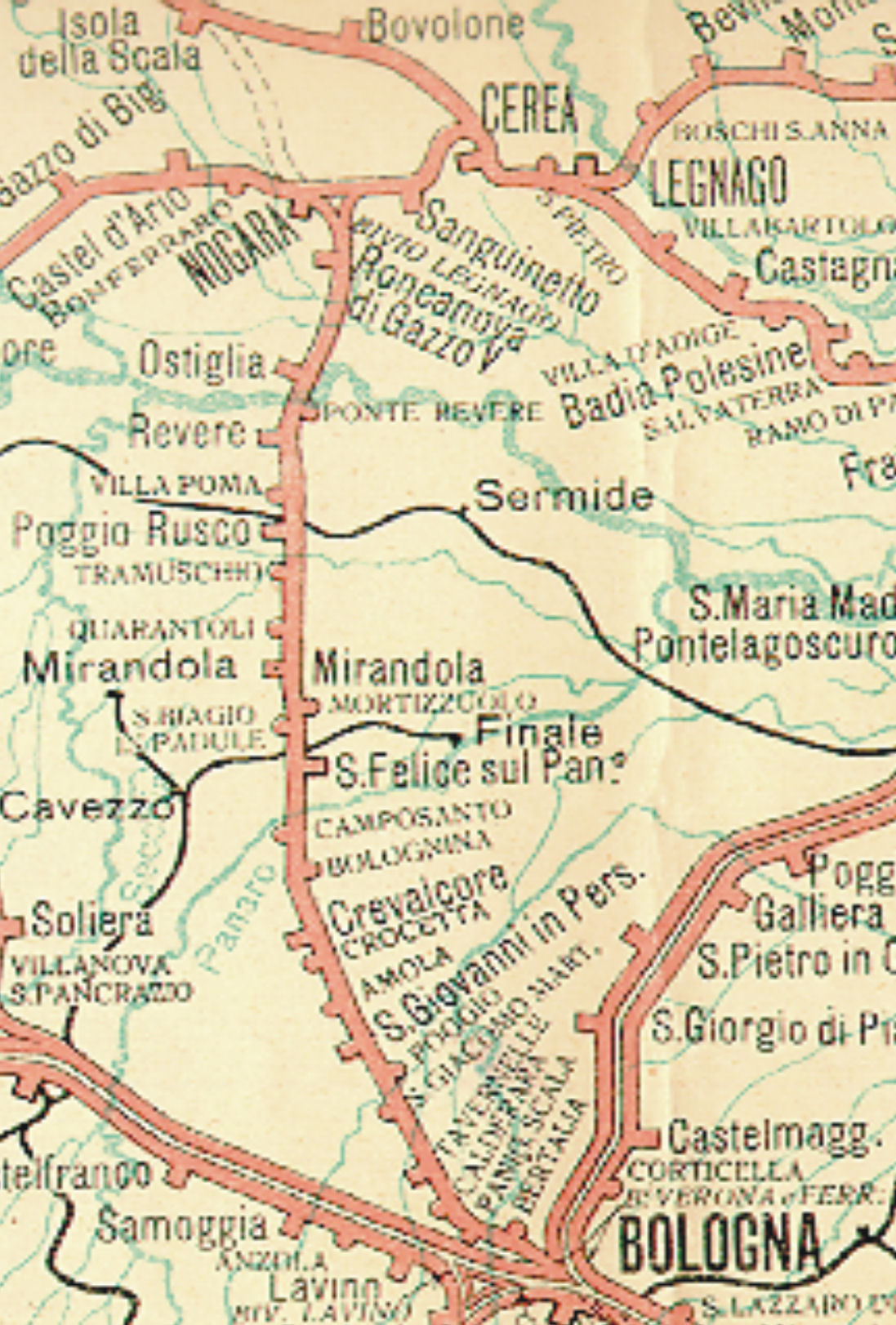
The line between Nogara and Bologna about 1912

In 1905 the line passed into the control of Ferrovie dello Stato. The building continued to be slow: Revere Scalo was reached on 23 July 1909, while the bridge over the Po river and the Ostiglia Station were opened on 26 November 1911.

On 1 October 1912, the line was opened to a new station in Nogara, which already had an existing station on the Mantua–Monselice railway. The two stations were connected by a chord, known as Cerea junction–Nogara junction and both operated until the Mantua–Monselice was deviated to run through the Verona–Bologna line station.

On 31 May 1914 the line was opened from Nogara to Isola della Scala, where the new line connected with the Verona–Rovigo line. In this case, the new station replaced the old station on the other line, as on the same day a deviation of the Verona–Rovigo line was opened. The 1 February 1924 the line was opened between Isola della Scala and Saint Lucia junction, where it separates from the Verona–Mantua railway. The Verona–Bologna line was finally completed after more than forty years of work.

=== Duplication ===
In the 1970s the rail node at Verona was completely restructured, with the opening of San Massimo junction, the displacement of Saint Lucia junction west of its old location and the duplication of the Verona–Bologna from the new Saint Lucia junction south to the former Verona Ca' di David station.

Work on the doubling from Ca' di David to Tavernelle d'Emilia only started at the beginning of the 1990s. After years of discussions and proposals, the first worksites were opened at Tavernelle, Ostiglia and Buttapietra. The approved project included a two-track deviation for much of the route. Because of the bankruptcy of the construction firms involved, no work was carried out for several years. The first duplicated section opened between Ca' di David and Nogara in 2001. On 7 January 2005 an accident at Bolognina railway station between a freight and a passenger train killed 17 people: this led to the banning of freight trains on the route until December 2008 and the acceleration of work. On 7 October 2005 work was completed between Tavernelle Emilia and Persiceto Nord. Duplication of the section to Crevalcore was opened on 31 October 2006.

The rest of the duplication of the line was completed in 2007 and 2008. Double track reached San Felice sul Panaro on 31 March 2007. Work was completed between Poggio Rusco and San Felice on 26 October 2008. Finally the new route between Nogara and Poggio Rusco was opened on 14 December 2008 although part of the route between P.C. Ostiglia Nord and Poggio Rusco station was opened as a single line. Duplication of this short stretch was completed on 26 July 2009. While the old Nogara–Ostiglia–Poggio Rusco line has been partially dismantled, it remains active between Revere yard and its connection with the new line near Poggio Rusco. The cost of the duplication between 2004 and 2009 was €1.1 billion.

== Features ==
The Verona–Bologna railway is a double track line with both lines equipped with bi-directional signaling. It is laid with 60 kg/m (40 lb/ft) rail on prestressed concrete sleepers. Both tracks are electrified at 3,000 volts DC; electrification of the original single track line was completed in 1941.

The Verona–Bologna line is the first line in Italy to be operated under the new Italian high capacity (Italian: "alta capacità") system, thanks to the duplication work; this project is intended to reduce journey times for both passenger and freight trains.

== Route ==
The railway passes through the provinces of Verona, Mantua, Modena and Bologna. Starting from Verona Porta Nuova station, where it connects with the line from Innsbruck and the Milan–Venice line. The railway runs along the double track that leads to Saint Lucia Junction /P.C., formerly just called Saint Lucia Junction. At this point it crosses several different lines:

- a line from San Massimo Junction /P.C. that connects the Brenner line to the Verona–Bologna line, bypassing Verona station;
- a line from Fenilone Junction /P.C. that allows trains from the Milan–Venice line to avoid the Verona node and access the Quadrante Europa intermodal yard;
- a line from Verona Porta Nuova marshalling yard;
- a line to Mantua and Modena (the Verona–Mantua–Modena line).

After Saint Lucia junction, the railway runs through a long straight section that leads to the town of Isola della Scala. Along this stretch are the station of Buttapietra and the old station of Verona Ca di David. The latter has been closed and during the duplication of the line it was turned into a crossover, where trains can change tracks as required.

At station of Isola della Scala occurs at the intersection with the Verona–Rovigo line, which since 1985 has only run towards Cerea, while the section towards Dossobuono has been abandoned and partially dismantled.

The railway then continues through the centres of Nogara—where it intersects with the Mantua–Monselice railway, Ostiglia and Poggio Rusco. On the section where the line crosses the Po river the new route deviates significantly from the old one. The town of Revere, on the south bank of the Po formerly had both a railway station and a marshalling yard called Revere Scalo. The new route, however, has eliminated the curve at Revere, removing the railway for both the station and yard. The old Ostiglia station was formerly the location of a junction with the former line to Legnago and Treviso, which was destroyed by allied bombing during World War II. The old Ostiglia station has been replaced by a new station, while that of Revere has been abandoned. The old line between Revere Scalo yard and the Poggio Rusco station remain active. Poggio Rusco is at the junction with the Suzzara–Ferrara railway, part of the Ferrovie Emilia Romagna (Emilia Romagna Railways, FER), a company owned by the Emilia-Romagna regional government.

The line continues to San Felice sul Panaro, turning to serve the town of Mirandola, served by a slightly relocated station, which uses the old station buildings. The line then runs directly to Crevalcore station. On this section is the Camposanto station near the bridge over the Panaro river, which was reopened with the duplication. On the same section is the former Bolognina station, which was closed when the railway was duplicated. Crevalcore was the site of the former junction with the disused Ferrara-Modena railway managed by the Società Veneta ("Veneta Company"). After Crevalcore, the railway turns to the south-east and runs parallel to that of Highway 568 via San Giovanni in Persiceto and Tavernelle d'Emilia. A branch of the former Ferrara–Modena railway branched off at San Giovanni in Persiceto station to Decima, but was destroyed by bombing during World War II.

Shortly before Tavernelle, where a passing loop (Italian: Posto di movimento) has recently years been built, the new line passes over a viaduct on which there is a new station at Osteria Nuova. After Tavernelle, the line continues straight towards Santa Viola station. Along this stretch, a connection to the Bologna ring railway branches off at Tavernelle junction. The latter line used to pass over the Verona–Bologna line shortly further south: during the extension of Bologna Airport’s runway in 2004, the ring line was lowered to pass under the runway and now also runs under the Verona–Bologna line. Just north of the flyover, there is a station at Calderara–Bargellino, which opened on 15 September 2008.

Just before Santa Viola the line begins to run beside the double line formed by the Porrettana railway from Pistoia and the traditional line from Milan, while the high-speed line from Milan connects to the Verona-Bologna line. Both lines then run to Bologna Centrale Station where they connect with the lines to Florence (high-speed and traditional), Ancona and Padua.

== Operations ==
Regional passenger services are managed by Trenitalia with the collaboration of Ferrovie Emilia Romagna on the section between Poggio Rusco and Bologna. It is also used by all types of Trenitalia long distance trains, including Inter-city and Frecciarossa high-speed trains. Freight traffic is run by several companies.

== See also ==
- Crevalcore train crash
- List of railway lines in Italy
