= Verona–Rovigo railway =

Railway line in Italy

The Verona–Rovigo railway is a state-owned railway line that connects two provincial capitals of Veneto: Verona and Rovigo. The main hub is Legnago. Main centers crossed are also Bovolone, Cerea, Badia Polesine, Lendinara.

The infrastructure is managed by RFI, while the passenger service is carried out by Trenitalia regional trains.

The line is single-track, except along two double-track sections:

- Verona Porta Nuova - Isola della Scala; where trains of the Verona-Bologna railway (including high-speed ones) run
- the Cerea - Legnago, which is also used by the Mantua-Monselice railway.

== History ==
The railway line was built and completed between 1876 and 1877 and opened at later times according to this scheme:

Deals with	Length	Inauguration
Verona Porta Nuova –Dossobuono	7 km	April 8, 1851
Badia Polesine–Rovigo	28,5 km	October 23, 1876
Legnago–Badia Polesine	18,6 km	February 1, 1877
Dossobuono–Legnago	42,5 km	August 6, 1877

Until 1986, the trains on the line passed through the Dossobuono station using the Isola della Scala section, even though the direct section, belonging to the Bologna–Verona line, had already existed since 1924. Traffic on the Dossobuono – Isola della Scala section was abolished in 1986, while its decommissioning was made official by decree of the Ministry of Transport no. 73 of 15 April 1987.

Since 14 June 2009, the management of the regional railway service has been transferred to Sistemi Territoriali, which carries out the operation on behalf of Trenitalia.
