= Venezia Mestre railway station =

Railway station in Venice, Italy

Venezia Mestre
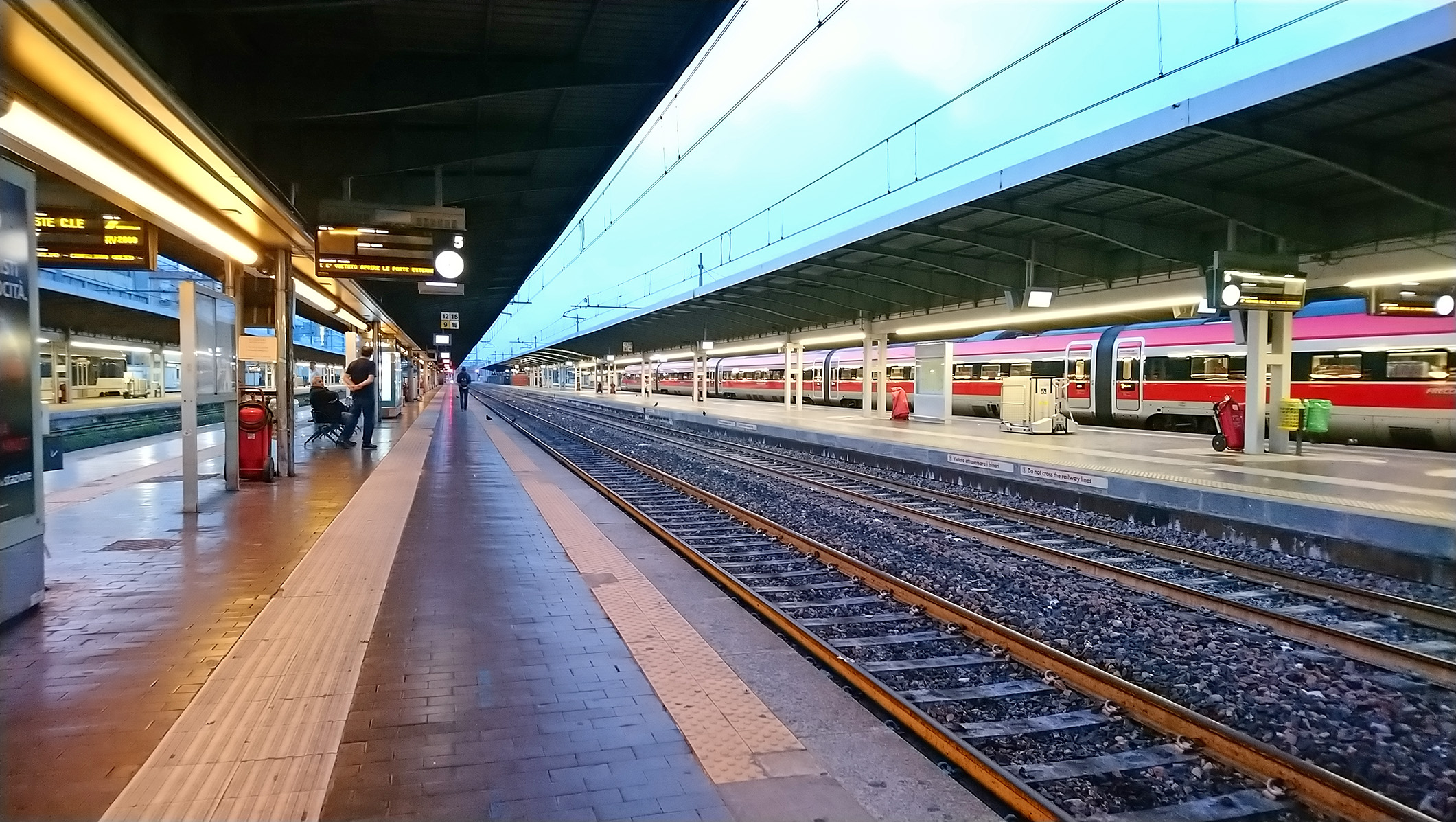
- Venezia Mestre station platforms

General information
- Location: Piazzale Pietro Favretti; 30171 Venezia; Venice, Venice, Veneto; Italy
- Coordinates: 45°28′57″N 12°13′53″E
- Owner: Rete Ferroviaria Italiana
- Operator: Grandi Stazioni
- Lines: Milano–Venezia; Venezia–Udine; Trento–Venezia; Venezia–Trieste; Adria–Mestre railway
- Train operators: Trenitalia
- Connections: Urban and suburban buses

Other information
- IATA code: XVY

History
- Opened: 1842
Services
Preceding station	Trenitalia	Following station
Padova towards Milano Centrale	Frecciarossa	Venezia Santa Lucia Terminus
Padova towards Milano Centrale	Frecciarossa	San Donà di Piave-Jesolo towards Trieste Centrale
Padova towards Lecce	Frecciarossa	Venezia Santa Lucia Terminus
Padova towards Napoli Centrale or Reggio di Calabria Centrale	Frecciarossa	Portogruaro–Caorle towards Trieste Centrale
Padova towards Napoli Centrale or Reggio di Calabria Centrale	Frecciarossa	Venezia Santa Lucia Terminus
Padova towards Roma Termini	InterCity; Trieste–Rome	San Donà di Piave-Jesolo towards Trieste Centrale
Padova towards Roma Termini	InterCity Notte; Trieste–Rome	Venezia Santa Lucia towards Trieste Centrale
Padova towards Genève-Cornavin	EuroCity	Venezia Santa Lucia Terminus
Padova towards Zürich HB	EuroCity	Venezia Santa Lucia Terminus
Treviso towards Wien Hbf	Railjet	Venezia Santa Lucia Terminus
Padova towards Verona Porta Nuova	Regionale Veloce; Verona–Venice	Venezia Santa Lucia Terminus
Quarto d'Altino towards Trieste Centrale	Regionale Veloce; Venice–Trieste via Cervignano del Friuli	Venezia Santa Lucia Terminus
Mogliano Veneto towards Trieste Centrale	Regionale Veloce; Venice–Trieste via Udine	Venezia Santa Lucia Terminus
Mira-Mirano towards Verona Porta Nuova or Brescia	Regionale; Verona–Venice	Venezia Porto Marghera towards Venezia Santa Lucia
Venezia Mestre Olimpia towards Portogruaro-Caorle	Regionale; Venice–Portogruaro	Venezia Porto Marghera towards Venezia Santa Lucia
Venezia Mestre Gazzera towards Trieste Centrale	Regionale; Venice–Trieste via Udine	Venezia Porto Marghera towards Venezia Santa Lucia
Spinea towards Bassano del Grappa	Regionale; Bassano del Grappa–Venice	Venezia Porto Marghera towards Venezia Santa Lucia
Preceding station		Following station
Padova towards Napoli Centrale	Venezia–Napoli	Venezia Santa Lucia Terminus
Location
- Location within Veneto Location within Northern Italy Location within Italy

Venezia Mestre railway station (Italian: Stazione di Venezia Mestre) is a junction station in the comune of Venice, Italy. It is located within the mainland frazione of Mestre, and is classified by its owner, Rete Ferroviaria Italiana, as a gold category station.

The station is situated at the 257.907 kilometres (160.256 mi) mark of the Milan–Venice line, and at the 27.778 kilometres (17.260 mi) mark of the Adria–Mestre line. It is also the point of origin of other lines that converge towards Venice as the capital of the region Veneto.

Additionally, the station forms the border between the boroughs of Mestre and Marghera, that are connected by the two underpasses of the station, one just for pedestrians and the other for both pedestrians and cyclists.

Venezia Mestre is one of Venice's two most important railway stations, the other one being Venezia Santa Lucia, a terminal station on the island of Venice. Both stations are managed by Grandi Stazioni, and they are linked with each other by the Ponte della Libertà (English: Liberty Bridge) between the mainland and the island.

While Venezia Santa Lucia station's main doors are usually closed at night, Venezia Mestre station is always open and people can pass by also at night, to get on one of the few night trains or to use the underpasses between Mestre and Marghera (shops and ticket offices are usually closed at night).

Late night or early morning trains might stop at Venezia Mestre station if the Venezia Santa Lucia station is closed at such time. In that case, passengers directed to/coming from the Historical Center of Venice they should use the 24/7 ACTV bus service (lines 2 and H1) from Piazzale Roma to Venezia Mestre station and vice versa.

== Train services ==
The following services call at the station:

- High speed services (Frecciarossa) Salerno – Naples – Rome – Florence – Bologna – Padua – Venice
- High speed services (Italo) Salerno – Naples – Rome – Florence – Bologna – Padua – Venice
- High speed services (Frecciarossa) Naples – Rome – Florence – Bologna – Padua – Venice
- High speed services (Frecciarossa) Rome Airport – Rome – Florence – Bologna – Padua – Venice
- High speed services (Frecciarossa) Turin – Milan – Verona – Padua – Venice – Trieste
- High speed services (Frecciarossa) Turin – Milan – Verona – Padua – Venice
- High speed services (Frecciarossa) Milan – Verona – Padua – Venice – Treviso – Udine
- High speed services (Frecciargento) Reggio Calabria – Lamezia Terme – Paola – Salerno – Naples – Rome – Florence – Bologna – Ferrara – Padua – Venice
- High speed services (Frecciabianca) Lecce – Bari – Ancona – Rimini – Padua – Venice
- Intercity services (EuroCity) Munich – Innsbruck – Verona – Padua – Venice
- Intercity services (EuroCity) Zurich – Arth-Goldau – Bellinzona – Milan – Verona – Padua – Venice
- Intercity services (EuroCity) Geneva – Lausanne – Brig – Milan – Verona – Padua – Venice
- High speed services (Railjet) Vienna – Klagenfurt – Villach – Udine – Treviso – Venice
- Intercity services (Intercity) Rome – Florence – Bologna – Padua – Venice – Trieste
- Night train (Nightjet) Munich – Tarvisio – Udine – Treviso – Venice
- Night train (Nightjet) Rome – Bologna – Venice – Villach – Vienna
- Night train (Nightjet) Vienna – Linz – Salzburg – Villach – Udine – Treviso – Venice
- Night train (Intercity Notte) Rome – Bologna – Venice – Udine – Trieste
- Express services (Regionale Veloce) Bologna – Ferrara – Rovigo – Padua – Venice
- Express services (Regionale Veloce) Verona – Vicenza – Padua – Venice
- Express services (Regionale Veloce) Verona – Padua – Venice – Latisana
- Express services (Regionale Veloce) Trieste – Cervignano del Friuli – Portogruaro – Venice
- Express services (Regionale Veloce) Trieste – Gorizia – Udine – Treviso – Venice
- Regional services (Treno regionale) Ferrara – Rovigo – Monselice – Padua – Venice
- Regional services (Treno regionale) Verona – Vicenza – Padua – Venice
- Regional services (Treno regionale) Trieste – Gorizia – Udine – Treviso – Venice
- Regional services (Treno regionale) Bassano del Grappa – Castelfranco Veneto – Venice
- Local services (Treno regionale) Portogruaro – Venice
- Local services (Treno regionale) Adria – Piove di Sacco – Venice

== Traffic ==
Venezia Mestre is a crucial part of the railway system of the north east of Italy. An important port for both freight and passengers, it has approximately 500 trains and 85,000 passengers each day. It is also a strategic hub, at which the Milan–Venice, Venice–Udine, Trento–Venice, Venice–Trieste and Adria–Mestre lines converge, and from which a four track main line leads to Venezia Santa Lucia.

== Future developments ==
Venezia Mestre will be one of the railway stations on the so-called Pan-European Corridor 5. It will also be part of the Veneto region's Metropolitan Regional Rail System (SFMR) network, which will involve all of its lines. For better management of the Venezia Mestre railway junction, numerous works are therefore currently underway.

First, the number of platforms at the station is being increased from nine to thirteen, together with crossing loops.

Secondly, and most importantly, work is being done to achieve the partial reactivation of the Linea dei Bivi^{(it)}, which has been closed since 1993. The reactivated line will begin at Marocco junction, on the Venice-Udine line, and end almost at the former Mirano junction. It will include the former Orgnano double junction, and Spinea junction, on the Trento–Venice line.

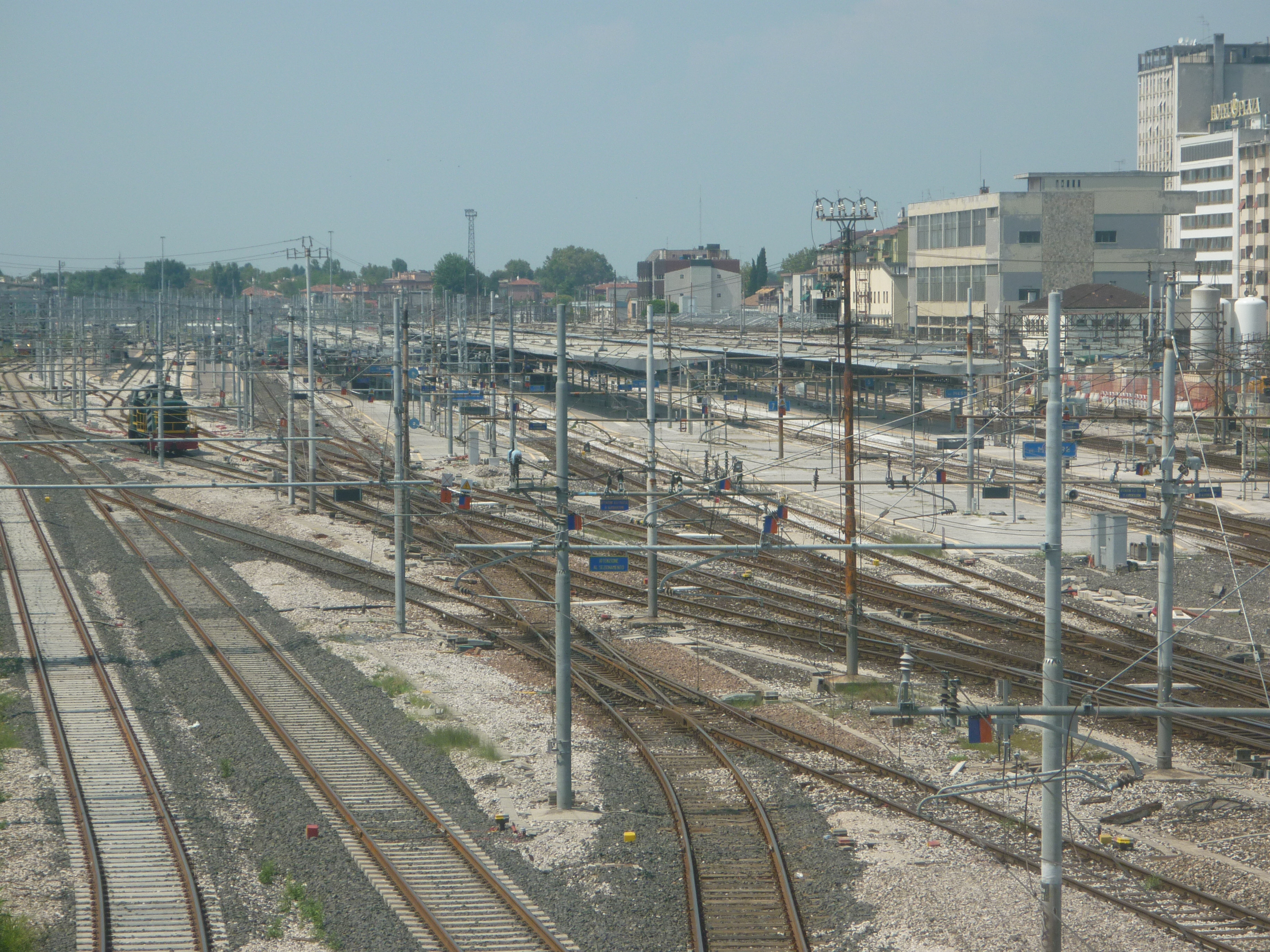
The station's tracks, and platforms for trains towards the Ponte della Libertà and Venice. Track 1 is at the far right.

Instead of merging with the Milan-Venice line in the direction of Lombardy's capital, the reborn Bivi line passes over a curved bridge, the Maerne viaduct, which crosses more than four tracks of the Milan line. The reopened Bivi line then joins the Milan-Venice line at the Venice Mestre station throat. This arrangement separates the Trento and Milan lines from each other, and also create an alternative route for trains to Udine.

The new line from the former Orgnano double junction over the Maerne viaduct to Venezia Mestre was officially opened on 30 May 2008 and entered service on 10 June 2008. From 7 June 2008, there was consequential abandonment of the Gruppo Scambi (ex Quadrivio Catene) high speed line between the former Orgnano double junction and just before Venezia Mestre, including the former Venezia Asseggiano railway station. The closed portion of line will be reused as a disused railway bicycle path.

These changes will assign to each incoming line a dedicated track, without any intersections between the lines. In particular, tracks 1 and 2 are assigned to the line from Trieste, tracks 3 and 4 to the Udine line, 5 and 6 to the Padua high speed line, 9, 10 and 11 to the original Padua line, and 12 and 13 to the lines for Adria and Trento. Finally, tracks 7 and 8 will be dedicated to those trains leaving or arriving at Venezia Mestre that do not also leave or arrive from Venezia Santa Lucia.

The Venezia Mestre station building is also being modified with a view to better organization of spaces, and to suit commercial services closely linked to the railway, such as the ticket office. It will also become fully accessible to disabled people, through the construction of lifts to each platform.

In the first half of 2009, all the old paddle type destination boards at the station were replaced with new boards fitted with LED displays.

== Public transport connections ==
The station is served by several ATVO suburban bus routes, and 15 urban and 1 suburban bus routes operated by ACTV, 13 of them in transit.

=== Urban/suburban buses ===
- 2 Venezia – Della Libertà – Vempa – Mestre FS (Mestre Station) – Piave – Circonvallazione – Torre Belfredo – V.le Garibaldi – S.Donà – Pasqualigo – V.le Don Sturzo
- 3 Sfmr Ospedale (Hospital) – Don Peron – Terraglio – Trezzo – V.le Garibaldi – Torre Belfredo – Circonvallazione – Carducci – Cappuccina – Vempa – Durando – P.zzale Giovannacci – Lavelli – P.zza S.Antonio – Paleocapa – Trieste – Catene – Villabona
- 10 Asseggiano – Ist.Morin – Gazzera Alta – Quarnaro – Mattuglie – Calabria – Miranese – Carducci – Cappuccina – Mestre FS – Trento – Miranese – Calabria – Mattuglie – Calucci – Gazzera Alta – Asseggiano
- 15 Aeroporto M.Polo – Tessera – Orlanda – Forte Marghera – P.zza 27 Ottobre – Corso Del Popolo – Vempa – Mestre FS (Mestre Station)
- 18 Mestre FS (Mestre Station) – Vempa – F.lli Bandiera – Malcontenta – Della Stazione – Padana – Colombara – Ca' Sabbioni
- 31 Pertini (Ist.Foscari) – Bissuola – Colombo – Olivi – Carducci – Piave – Mestre FS
- 31H Ospedale (Hospital) – Don Tosatto – Don Peron – Terraglio – Circonvallazione – Piave – Mestre FS (Mestre Station) – Ca' Marcello – Torino (Università) – V.le Ancona – Forte Marghera – Mestre Centro – V.le S.Marco – Via Sansovino – V.le Vespucci – Rione Pertini – Pertini – Bissuola – Mestre Centro – S.Rocco – Einaudi – Torre Belfredo – Cipressina – Ospedale
- 32 Mestre FS (Mestre Station) – Piave – Circonvallazione – Einaudi – Giuliani – Torre Belfredo – V.le Garibaldi – Spalti – Bissuola – Pertini – Camporese (Ist.Gritti)
- 32H Ospedale (Hospital) – Cipressina – Einaudi – S.Rocco – Mestre Centro – Bissuola – Pertini – Rione Pertini – V.le Vespucci – Via Sansovino – V.le S.Marco – Mestre Centro – 27 Ottobre – Forte Marghera – V.le Ancona – Via Torino – Ca' Marcello – Mestre FS (Mestre Station) – Piave – Circonvallazione – Terraglio – Don Peron – Dontosatto – Ospedale (Hospital)
- 33H Ospedale (Hospital) – Castellana – Via Piave – Mestre FS (Mestre Station) – Corso Del Popolo – Via Bissuola – Cavergnago
- 34H Ospedale (Hospital) – Terraglio – Via Piave – Mestre FS (Mestre Station) – Corso Del Popolo – Bissuola – Pertini
- 43 Venezia – Della Libertà – San Giuliano – Forte Marghera – V.le Ancona – Torino (Università) – Cà Marcello – Mestre FS (Mestre Station)
- 53 Piazza 27 Ottobre – Via Piave – Mestre FS (Mestre Station) – Montefibre – Malcontenta
- 86 Mestre FS – Vempa – Banchina Dell'Azoto
- N1 Venezia – V.le S. Marco – Piazza 27 Ottobre – Via Piave – Mestre FS (Mestre Station) – Venezia
- 8AE Via Mattei / Marcon – Mogliano – Mestre Centro

== See also ==
- History of rail transport in Italy
- List of railway stations in Veneto
- Marghera
- Rail transport in Italy
- Railway stations in Italy
- Venezia Santa Lucia railway station
