= Padua railway station =

Railway station in Padua, Italy

Padova
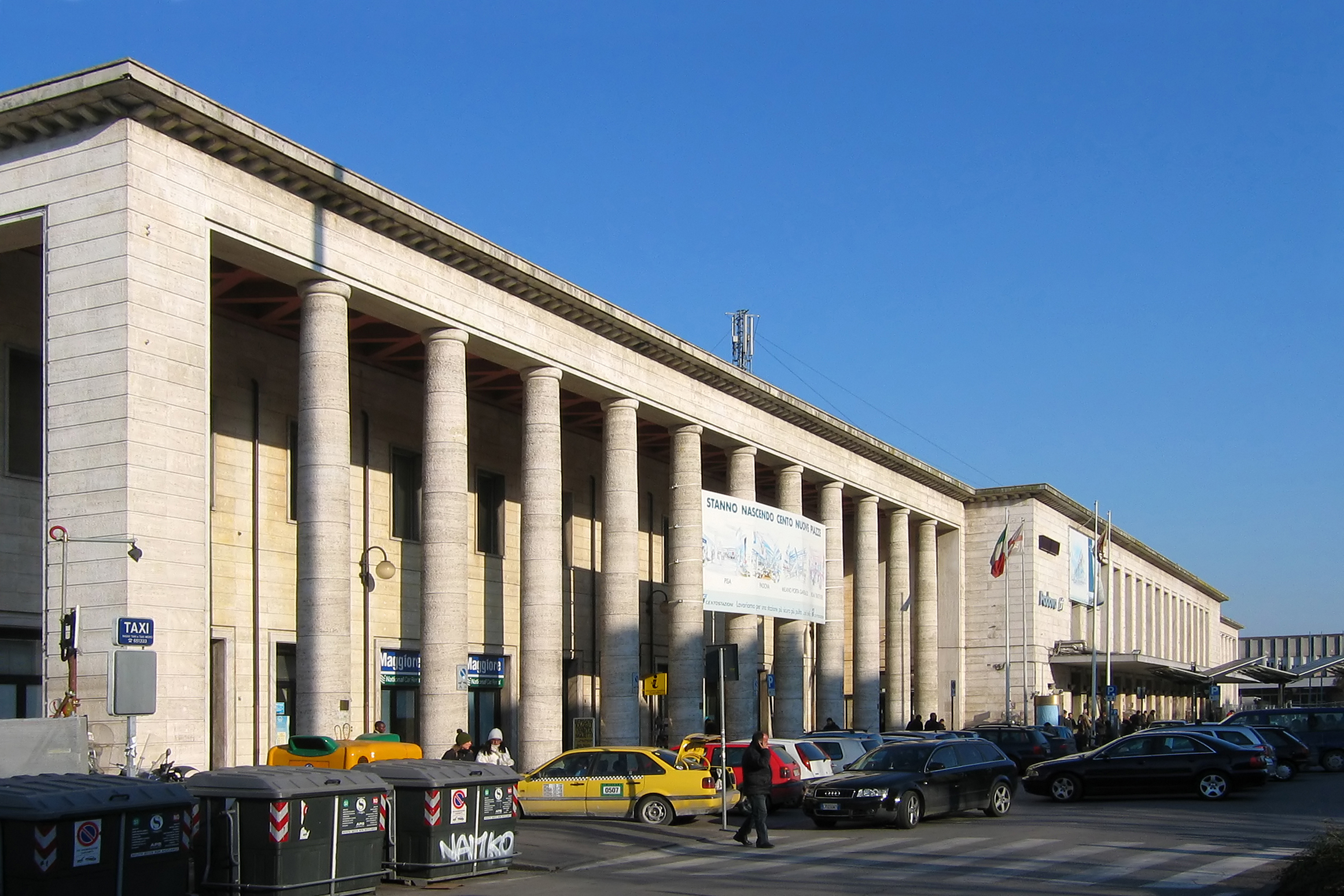
- The passenger building

General information
- Location: Piazzale Stazione 1; 35131 Padova; Padua, Padua, Veneto; Italy
- Coordinates: 45°25′03″N 11°52′49″E
- Owner: Rete Ferroviaria Italiana
- Operator: Centostazioni
- Lines: Milan–Venice; Padua–Bologna; Bassano del Grappa–Padua; Calalzo–Padua; Padua–Padua Interporto
- Train operators: Trenitalia; Thello; Nuovo Trasporto Viaggiatori
- Connections: Padua; Urban, suburban, national and international buses

Other information
- IATA code: QPA

History
- Opened: 3 December 1842; 183 years ago
Location
- Location within Veneto Location within Northern Italy Location within Italy

Padua railway station (Italian: Stazione di Padova), sometimes referred to as Padova Centrale, is the main station serving the city and comune of Padua, in the Veneto region, northeastern Italy.

Opened in 1842, the station forms part of the Milan–Venice railway, and is a junction for direct branch lines to the Padua–Bologna railway, the Bassano to Padua line, and the Camposampiero (junction for the Calalzo–Padua railway). Padua railway station is also the terminus of the short Padua–Padua Interporto railway.

The station is currently managed by Rete Ferroviaria Italiana (RFI). However, the commercial area of the passenger building is managed by Centostazioni. Each of these companies is a subsidiary of Ferrovie dello Stato Italiane (FS), Italy's state-owned railway company. Trains to and from the station are operated by Trenitalia, NTV and Thello.

== Location ==
Padua railway station is situated in the Piazzale Stazione, to the north of the historic city centre.

== Features ==
=== Passenger building ===
The passenger building has both passenger facilities and commercial activities. These include a ticket office, a customer support office, the Club Eurostar, many automated ticket machines, a luggage deposit (also used as the sale of train tickets and SITA, FTV and CTM bus tickets), an office of the railway police, two newsagents, two bars, a supermarket, two travel agencies, a bank, a post office, three car rental offices, as well as numerous businesses and travel agencies.

=== Station yard ===
Currently the station yard is composed of:

- Passenger yard with eleven loops, of which nine (tracks 1–3, and 5–10) are equipped with platforms and the remaining two (4 and 11) are used for manoeuvres, as well as stabling of trains;
- Secondary yard (ex Yard A, ex Padova Scalo), located south of the line to Venice; used only for stabling of trains that originate or terminate at this station;
- Locomotive depot, wedged between the lines to Milan and Bologna;
- Wash stalls, located north of the line to Milan; also used for stabling of trains.

Operating under this system are the Gruppo Scambi Altichiero (ex Bivio Altichiero) and the Gruppo Scambi Montà (ex Bivio Montà). Each of these yards connects with a corresponding namesake line from Padova Campo Marte railway station, and allows freight trains coming from Bologna to continue towards Camposampiero and Milan, respectively, without having to reverse direction.

== Train services ==
The station is one of the main railway nodes of the Italian system, with approximately 18.5 million passenger movements per year.

Around 450 passenger trains call at the station each day. They include trains of categories AV, ES *, ES *, CIS, EC, EN, Eurostar, IC, ICN, and R. The main domestic destinations served directly from Padua (all exclusively with Trenitalia trains) are Venice, Genoa, Turin, Como, Milan, Lecco, Bolzano/Bozen, Trento, Bassano del Grappa, Belluno, Calalzo di Cadore, Udine, Trieste, Mantua, Bologna, Florence, Pescara, Bari, Lecce, Rome, Naples, Messina, Palermo, and Syracuse.

Some of the services to and from Bassano and Trento are operated by Trentino Trasporti using Minuetto trains, but always on behalf of Trenitalia.

The main international destinations are Geneva, Lausanne, Zürich, Innsbruck, Munich and Vienna. International trains are made up of either Trenitalia or foreign railways' rolling stock, such as that of Österreichische Bundesbahnen (ÖBB).

In addition to passenger trains, the station is affected by a number of transit freight trains operated by both Trenitalia and other companies (Ferrovie Emilia Romagna, FFS Cargo, Linea, NordCargo, Sistemi Territoriali). These trains do not stop at the station for loading and unloading, as it has had no freight facilities since the 1990s; the freight facilities are now all concentrated at the Padova Interporto railway station.

The following services call at the station:

- High speed services (Frecciargento) Naples - Rome - Florence - Bologna - Padua - Venice
- High speed services (Frecciabianca) Turin - Milan - Verona - Padua - Venice - Trieste
- High speed services (Frecciabianca) Milan - Verona - Padua - Venice - Treviso - Udine
- High speed services (Frecciabianca) Lecce - Bari - Ancona - Rimini - Padua - Venice
- High speed services (Italo) Salerno - Naples - Rome - Florence - Bologna - Padua - Venice
- Intercity services (EuroCity) Munich - Innsbruck - Verona - Padua - Venice
- Intercity services (EuroCity) Geneva - Lausanne - Brig - Milan - Verona - Padua - Venice
- Intercity services (Intercity) Rome - Florence - Bologna - Padua - Venice - Trieste
- Night train (Intercity Notte) Rome - Bologna - Padua - Venice - Trieste
- Express services (Regionale Veloce) Bologna - Ferrara - Rovigo - Padua - Venice
- Express services (Regionale Veloce) Verona - Vicenza - Padua - Venice
- Express services ( Regionale Veloce ) Verona - Padua - Venice - Latisana
- Regional services (Treno regionale) Verona - Vicenza - Padua - Venice
- Regional services (Treno regionale) Bologna - Ferrara - Rovigo - Monselice - Padua
- Regional services (Treno regionale) Bassano del Grappa - Citadella - Padua
- Regional services (Treno regionale) Padua - Castelfranco Veneto - Treviso
- Regional services (Treno regionale) Padua - Castelfranco Veneto - Montebelluna
- Regional services (Treno regionale) (Vicenza -) Padua - Castelfranco Veneto - Montebelluna - Belluno (- Ponte nelle Alpi - Calalzo-Pieve di Cadore)

== Interchange ==
In the square in front of the passenger building are the termini of most of Padua's urban bus lines and the Translohr line (referred to simply as "tram"), all managed by APS. In addition, many provincial bus lines operated by APS, SITA, CTM, FTV, plus some national bus companies, include a stop at the station.

In June 2010, an intermodal centre was opened near the Chiesa della Pace, close to the railway station. It includes a 14 lane bus station, which serves as the terminus of several suburban lines, operated by a variety of transportation companies: APS, SITA, CTM, FTV, ACTV.

== See also ==
- History of rail transport in Italy
- List of railway stations in Veneto
- Rail transport in Italy
- Railway stations in Italy
