= Cerea railway station =

Railway station in Italy

Cerea
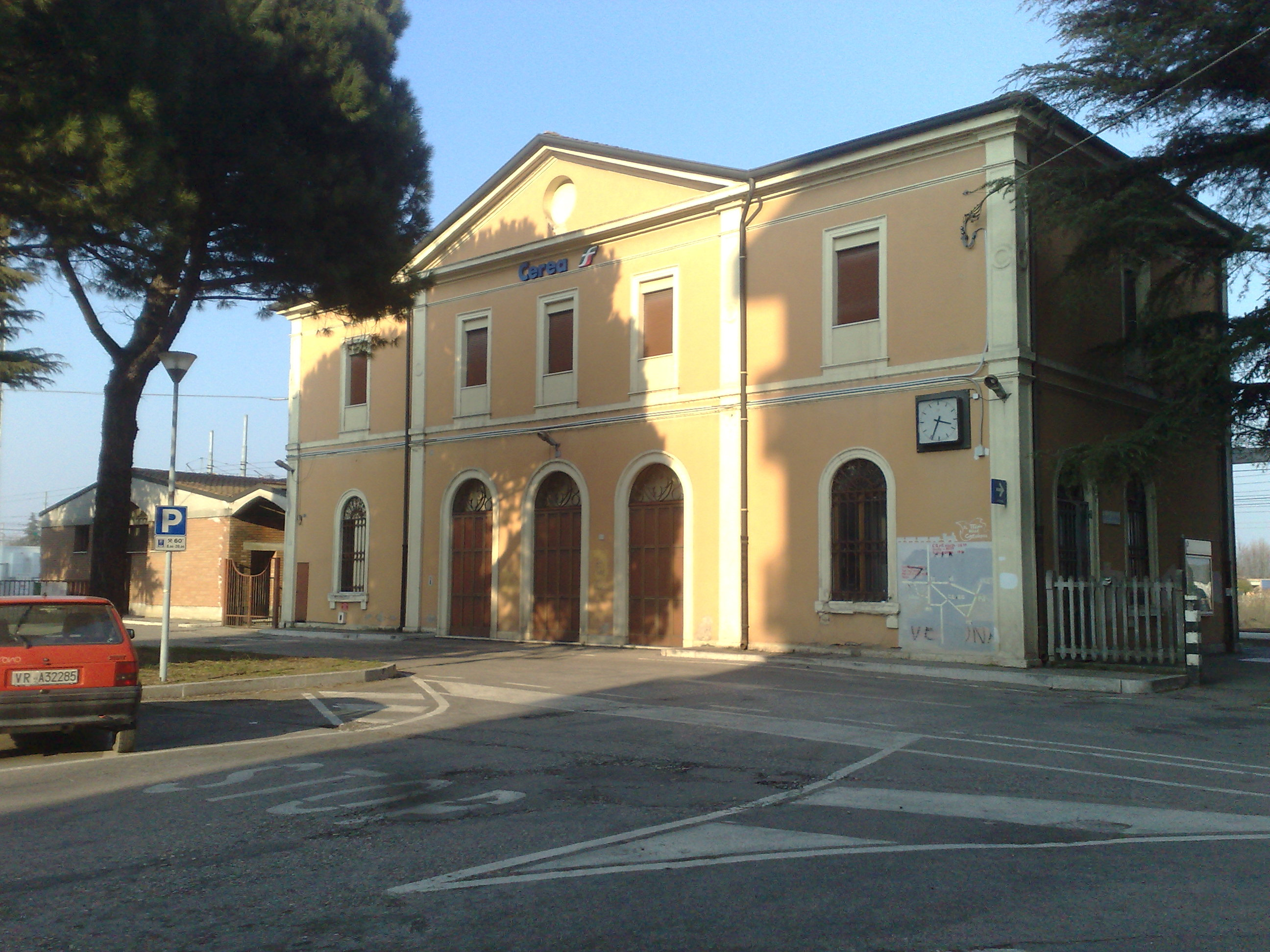

General information
- Location: Piazza Martiri della Libertà. Cerea, Verona, Veneto; Italy
- Coordinates: 45°12′0″N 11°13′0″E
- Owner: Rete Ferroviaria Italiana
- Operator: Rete Ferroviaria Italiana
- Lines: Mantua-Monselice; Verona-Rovigo
- Platforms: 2
- Connections: buses

Other information
- Classification: bronze

History
- Opened: 1877; 149 years ago
Location
- Location within Northern Italy

Cerea is a railway station in Italy. Located on the Mantua-Monselice railway and Verona-Rovigo railway, it serves the town of Cerea in the province of Verona.

== History ==
The train station was opened in 1877 by Dossobuono-Cerea, which completed the Verona-Rovigo railway. Nine years later the Mantua-Monselice railway reached the station.

== Structures and equipment ==
The station has two levels. Located on the lower floor there is a waiting room, office room, and relays. The upper floor was once reserved for habitation, but is now uninhabited. The railroad has six tracks, two of which are actually used by regional trains. The station also has a cargo terminal with several tracks.

== Train services ==
Sixty-eight trains service this station. Only regional trains stop at this station.

The station is served by the following services:

- Regional services (Treno regionale) Mantua - Nogara - Legnago - Monselice (- Venice)
- Regional services (Treno regionale) Verona - Isola della Scala - Legnago - Rovigo
