= San Bonifacio railway station =

Railway station in San Bonifacio, Italy

San Bonifacio
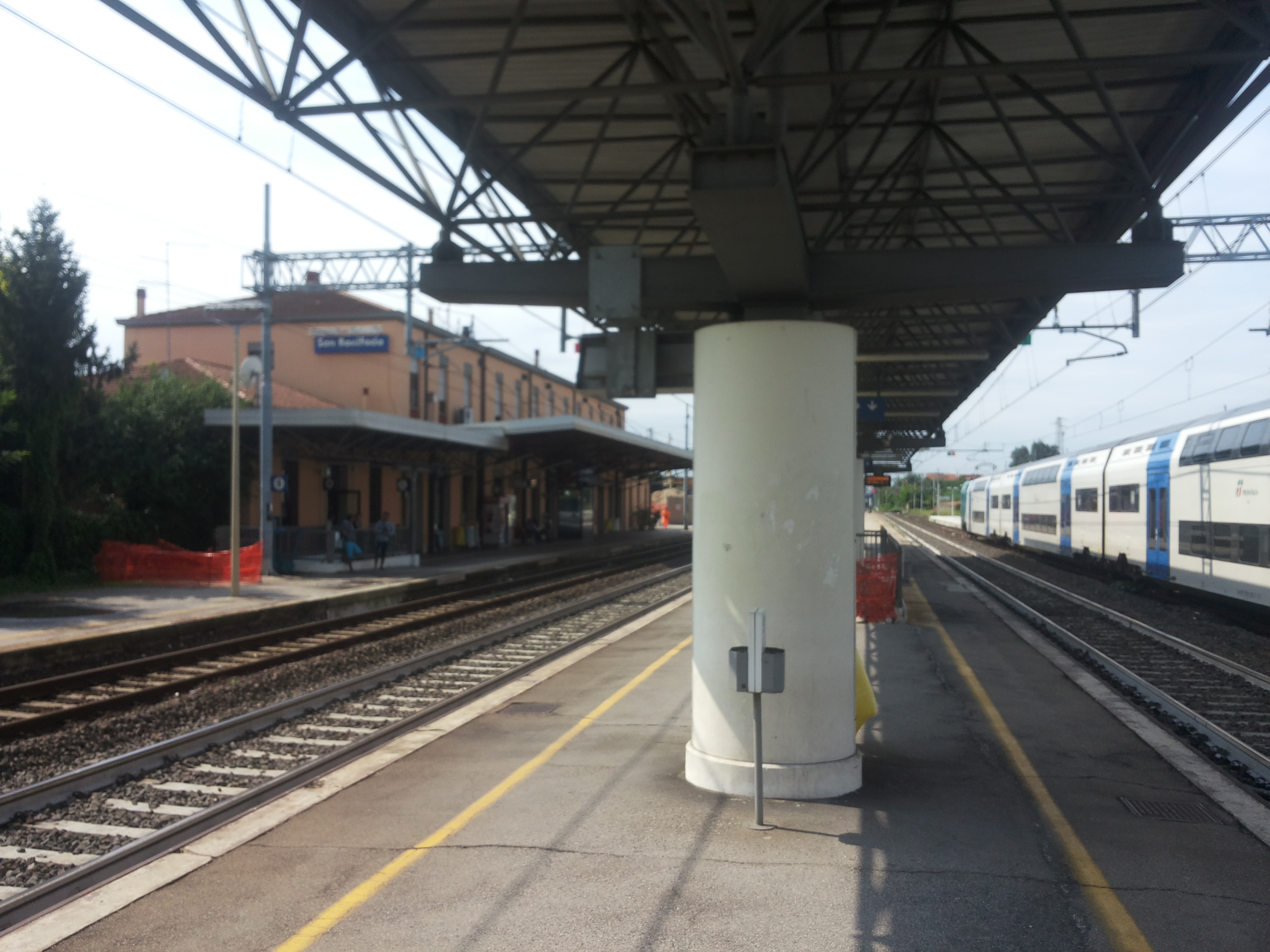
- San Bonifacio railway station

General information
- Location: Piazza Stazione 8, San Bonifacio, Veneto; Italy
- Coordinates: 45°24′09″N 11°16′26″E
- Owner: Rete Ferroviaria Italiana
- Operator: Trenitalia
- Line: Milan–Venice railway
- Distance: 24.091 km (14.969 mi) from Verona Porta Nuova
- Platforms: 4
- Tracks: 4

Other information
- Classification: Silver

History
- Opened: 1886; 140 years ago
Location
- Location within Veneto Location within Northern Italy Location within Italy

San Bonifacio (Italian: Stazione di San Bonifacio) is a railway station serving the town of San Bonifacio, in the region of Veneto, northern Italy. The station opened in 1886 and is located on the Milan–Venice railway. The train services are operated by Trenitalia.

== Train services ==
The station is served by the following services:

- Express services (Regionale Veloce) Verona - Vicenza - Padua - Venice
- Express services ( Regionale Veloce ) Verona - Padua - Venezia - Latisana
- Regional services (Treno regionale) Verona - Vicenza - Padua - Venice

== See also ==
- History of rail transport in Italy
- List of railway stations in Veneto
- Rail transport in Italy
- Railway stations in Italy
