= Lonigo railway station =

Railway station in Italy

Lonigo

General information
- Location: Via Trassegno 1, Lonigo, Veneto; Italy
- Coordinates: 45°24′47″N 11°20′47″E
- System: Railway Station
- Owner: Rete Ferroviaria Italiana
- Operator: Trenitalia
- Line: Milan–Venice railway
- Distance: 29.325 km (18.222 mi) from Verona Porta Nuova
- Platforms: 2
- Tracks: 2

Other information
- Classification: Silver

History
- Opened: 3 July 1849; 177 years ago
Location
- Location within Veneto Location within Northern Italy Location within Italy

Lonigo (Italian: Stazione di Lonigo) is a railway station serving the town of Lonigo, in the region of Veneto, northern Italy. The station is located on the Milan–Venice railway. The train services are operated by Trenitalia.

== History ==
Between 1882 and 1937 there was a San Bonifacio-Lonigo-Cologna Veneta tramway which also served the station. Between 1949 and 1965 the station was on the Lonigo-Lonigo Città railway, a 4.9 km (3.0 mi) branch line.

== Train services ==
The station is served by the following services:

- Regional services (Treno regionale) Verona - Vicenza - Padua - Venice

== See also ==
- History of rail transport in Italy
- List of railway stations in Veneto
- Rail transport in Italy
- Railway stations in Italy
