= Mantua railway station =

Railway station in Italy

Mantua Mantova
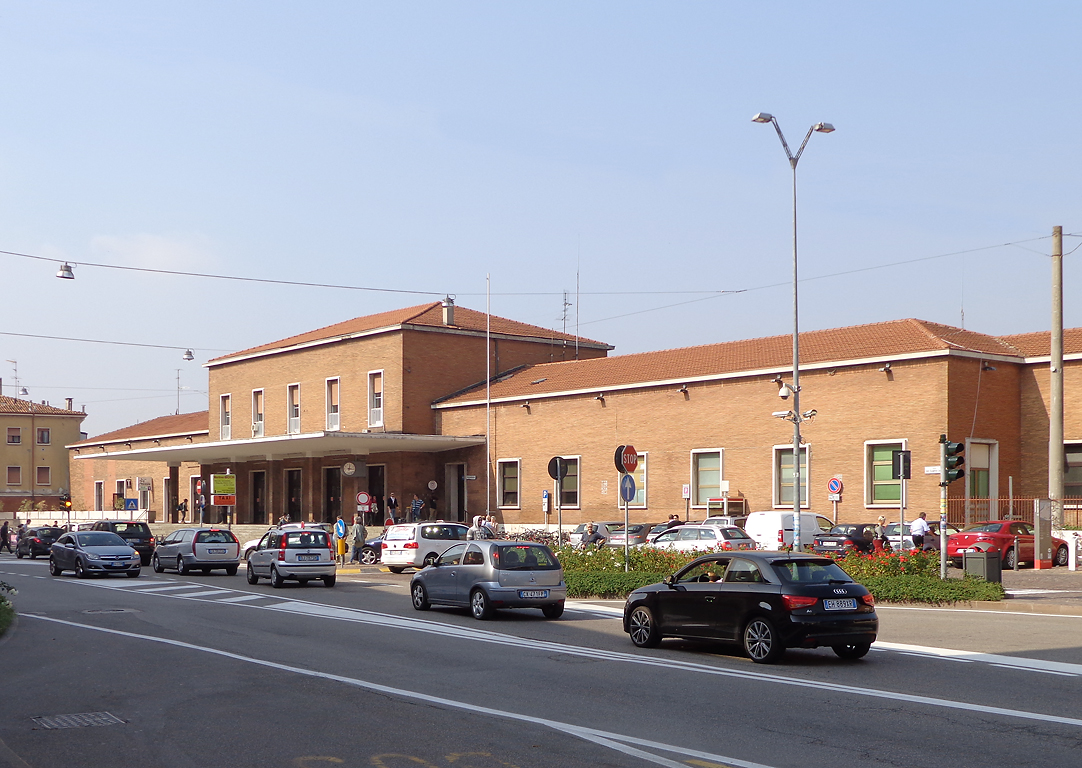

General information
- Location: Piazza Don Leoni; 46100 Mantova; Mantua (MN), Lombardy; Italy
- Coordinates: 45°09′32″N 10°47′01″E
- Operator: Rete Ferroviaria Italiana; Centostazioni
- Lines: Verona–Mantua–Modena railway Pavia–Mantua railway Mantua–Monselice railway
- Distance: 61.082 km (37.955 mi) from Modena
- Train operators: Trenitalia; Trenord
- Connections: Urban and suburban buses

Other information
- Classification: Gold

History
- Opened: 21 June 1873; 153 years ago
Location
- Location within Lombardy Location within Northern Italy Location within Italy

Mantua Railway Station (Italian: Stazione di Mantova) is the main station of the Comune of Mantua in the Region of Lombardy, northern Italy.

The station, situated at Piazza Don Leone and northwest of the city centre, was opened in 1873. It is a junction of three railway lines: Verona-Modena Railway, Milan-Mantua Railway and Mantua-Monselice Railway (which connects to Padua). There was a fourth railway line, the now defunct Mincio Valley Line (to Peschiera del Garda), which terminated at Mantua until 1967.

The station is currently managed by Rete Ferroviaria Italiana (RFI). The commercial area of the passenger building, however, is managed by Centostazioni.

Train services are operated by Trenitalia and Trenord, Lombardy's regional transport agency. All of the above companies, except Trenord, are wholly owned subsidiaries of Ferrovie dello Stato (FS), Italy's state-owned rail company. FS holds 50% ownership of Trenord through Trenitalia; Trenord's other 50% shares are held by former Milan's railway agency, LeNord.

== History ==
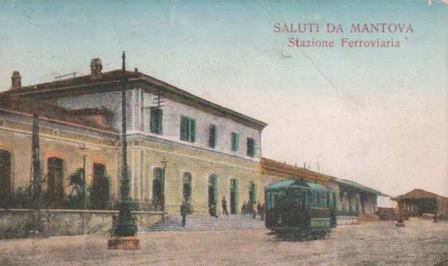
Mantua railway station, c. 1925, with tram line

Despite the transfer of Lombardy to Piedmont-Sardinia (later the Kingdom of Italy) in 1859, Mantua was garrisoned by Austrian troops who ruled Venetia (including Verona) until 1867. Construction of the Verona-Mantua railway began under the Austrian Empire's Austrian Southern Railway (Südbahn) in the 1850s.

In 1853, the first section of the Verona–Mantua–Modena railway was completed up to the San Antonio Mantovano station at Porto Mantovano, outside Mantua.

On 21 June 1873, the extended section crossed the River Mincio.

In 1874, the entire Verona-Modena Railway was completed. Through-train services connected Verona and Mantua to the Milan-Bologna Mainline at Modena.

== Facilities ==
The passenger building has two floors. The ground level hosts a ticket office, a waiting room, a cafe-bar and the office of the traffic control department. The first floor is reserved for use by Trenitalia.

The station yard has nine through tracks and one terminating track. Among the through tracks, four are used for freight traffic and six for passenger services. There are plans to relocate the on-site goods yard to Mantova Frassine station, since the new location would be closer to the industrial zone.

Platform 1 can be entered from the ticket office hall. Platforms 2, 3, 4, and 5 can be accessed through an underpass or by using lifts. All platforms can be used by wheelchair users, and there are raised walkways for entering trains.

== Passenger and train movements ==
The station has 2.8 million passenger movements per year.

Introduction of a direct service to Rome (axed in 2003) has begun in September 2016. The reinstated former Eurostar-Italy high-speed service now operates with Frecciargento carriages: the fastest travel time between Mantua and Modena is 35–40 minutes (1 hour 10 minutes by regional trains).

The following services call at this station:

- High-speed train (Trenitalia Frecciarossa) Rome-Mantua: Rome (Termini) - Rome (Tiburtina) - Florence - Bologna - Modena - Mantua
- Regional train (Trenitalia Regional) Verona-Mantua: Verona - Villafranca di Verona - Mantua
- Regional train (Trenitalia/TPER Regional) Mantua-Modena/Bologna: Mantua - Suzzara - Carpi - Modena - (Bologna)
- Regional train (Trenitalia Regional) Mantua-Cremona: Mantua - Bozzolo - Piadena - Cremona (stopping service)
- Regional train (Trenitalia Regional) Mantua-Monselice/Venice: Mantua – Nogara - Cerea - Monselice - (Venice (Mestre))
- Regional train (Trenord Regional Express) Mantua-Milan: Mantua - Piadena - Cremona - Codogno - Lodi - Milan (Roderego) - Milan (Lambrate) - Milan (Central)
- Regional train (Trenord Regio) Mantua-Parma: Mantua - Castellucchio - Piadena - Casalmaggiore - Parma

Closed line Until 1967, the station was the terminus of the Mincio Valley Line, which ran alongside the River Mincio to Lake Garda (Lago di Garda), arriving at Peschiera del Garda. A daily bus service, operated by APAM 46, now replaces this line.

== Interchange ==
The Mantua railway station lies just outside the centro storico (old town) World Heritage Site and is a 20-minute walk from the Palazzo del Te and the Piazza Sordello, considered to be at the two ends of the histotic centre. Buses connect the station to all parts of the city.

APAM, transport agency of Mantua, operates interurban bus routes which stop outside the railway station. Interurban buses connect Mantua with Brescia (No. 2), Peschiera del Garda (No. 46) and nearby towns such as Asola, Sabbionetta, Moglia, Mirandola and Suzzara. The railway station's interchange is also a stop of other intercity bus services, such as ATV Verona-Mantua (No. 148) and long-distance coaches to Modena and Bolzano/Bozen.

Between March 2013 and December 2014, a direct shuttle bus service ran daily between the Mantua railway station and Verona-Villafranca Airport, connecting the city with its closest international gateway. This service was provided by APAM. The journey took 45 minutes. This service ceased operation on 1 January 2015.

== Future ==
Since August 2014, new regional carriages with enhanced mobility and comfort have been introduced to Verona-Mantua-Modena services. After the World Expo 2015, Trenord has guaranteed 18 to 20 sets of double-decker regional trains on services between Milan and Mantua.

In 2015, talks with the Italian State Railway have begun in order to improve train connections to Verona and Milan. Current regional trains takes 46 minutes to complete a journey of 37 km between Mantua and Verona. New proposals could see the introduction of non-stop services, which could take only 30 minutes on the same route, during morning and evening peak hours.

Since 2015, doubling of tracks on the Milan-Cremona-Mantua Railway is underway to promote reliability and punctuality to train services.

== See also ==
- History of rail transport in Italy
- List of railway stations in Lombardy
- Rail transport in Italy
- Railway stations in Italy
- Mantua–Asola Tramway
