= Mogliano Veneto railway station =

Railway station in Mogliano Veneto, Italy

Mogliano Veneto
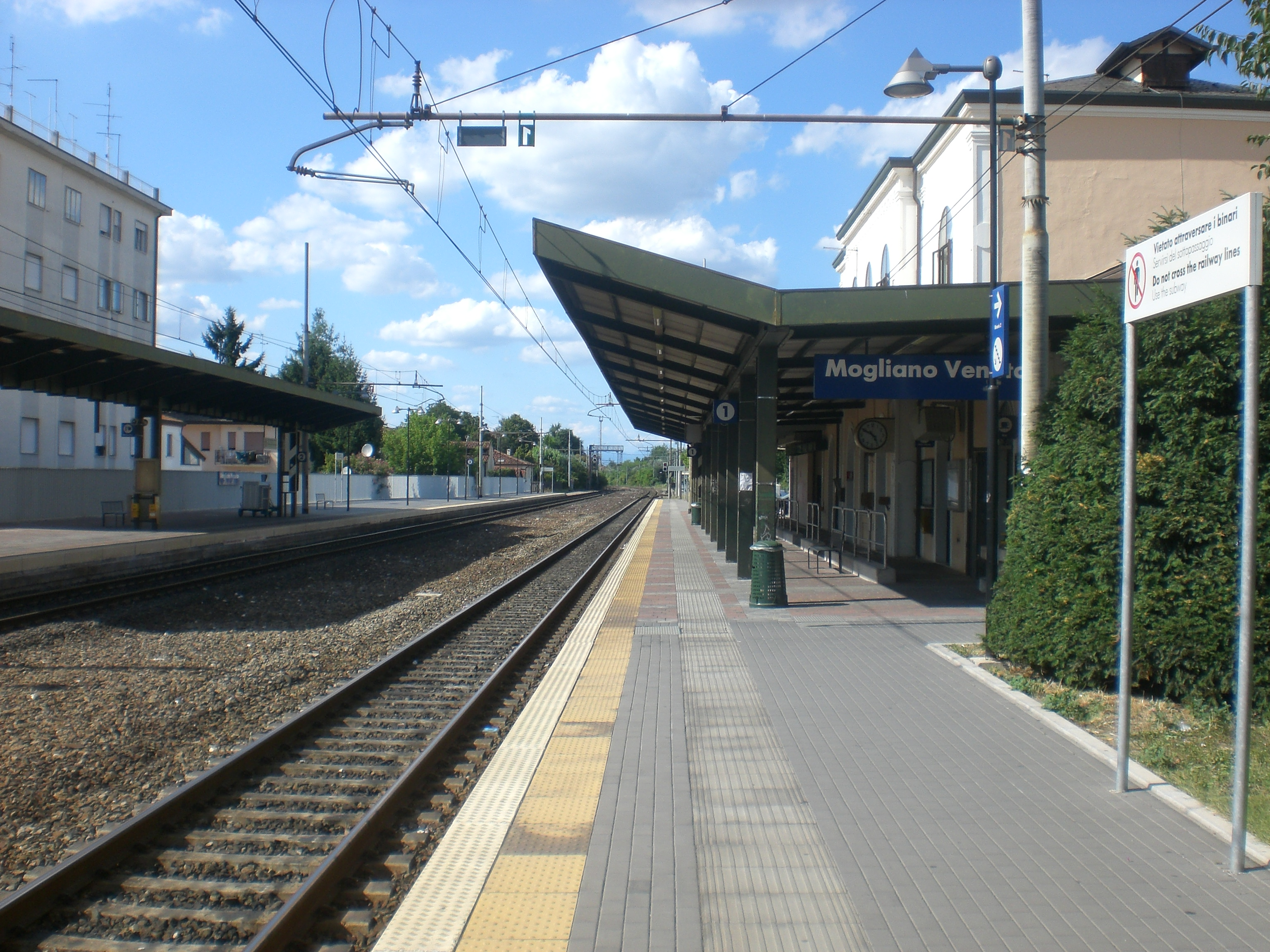
- Mogliano Veneto railway station

General information
- Location: Via Toti dal Monte 3, Mogliano Veneto, Veneto; Italy
- Coordinates: 45°33′42″N 12°13′58″E
- Owner: Rete Ferroviaria Italiana
- Operator: Trenitalia
- Line: Venice–Udine railway
- Distance: 9.273 km (5.762 mi) from Venezia Mestre
- Platforms: 2
- Tracks: 2

Other information
- Classification: Silver

History
- Opened: 1851; 175 years ago
Location
- Location within Veneto Location within Northern Italy Location within Italy

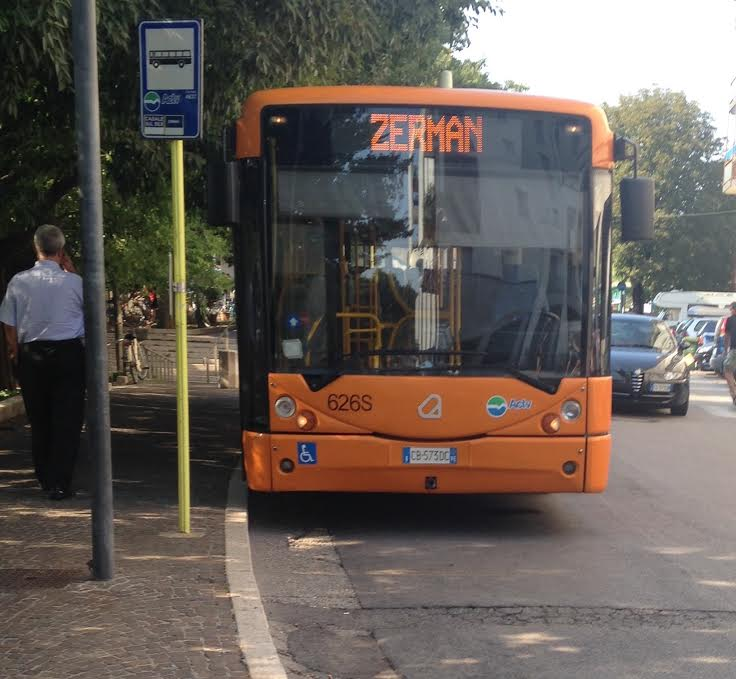
A bus outside the station.

The station of Mogliano Veneto (Italian: Stazione di Mogliano Veneto) is a railway station serving the town of Mogliano Veneto, in the region of Veneto, northern Italy. The station opened in 1851 and is located on the Venice–Udine railway. The train services are operated by Trenitalia.

== History ==
The station was built in 1851 with the opening of the first section of the line between Mestre and Treviso. Initially this was single-track railway, the station was equipped with the only double track for passing trains (on the west side of the square). The number of tracks at the station was increased to three with the doubling of the line (track one became the second track, the central one) and in 1926 the passenger building was expanded. Until 2005 there was a third track used only by freight trains.

Until 1939 it was called simply Mogliano.

== Modernisation ==
In 2007 the platforms were raised, works related to the Metropolitan Railway Service of Veneto.

== Train services ==
The station is served by the following service(s):

- Express services (Regionale Veloce) Trieste - Gorizia - Udine - Treviso - Venice
- Regional services (Treno regionale) Trieste - Gorizia - Udine - Treviso - Venice

== See also ==
- History of rail transport in Italy
- List of railway stations in Veneto
- Rail transport in Italy
- Railway stations in Italy
