= Castelnuovo del Garda railway station =

Railway station in Veneto, Italy

Castelnuovo del Garda

General information
- Location: Castelnuovo del Garda, Verona, Lombardy; Italy
- Coordinates: 45°25′50″N 10°45′29″E
- Operator: Rete Ferroviaria Italiana
- Line: Milan–Venice railway
- Platforms: 2
- Tracks: 2
- Train operators: Trenitalia; Trenord

Other information
- Classification: Bronze
Location
- Location within Veneto Location within Northern Italy Location within Italy

Castelnuovo del Garda (Italian: Stazione di Castelnuovo del Garda) is a railway station serving Castelnuovo del Garda, in the region of Lombardy, northern Italy. The station lies on the Milan–Venice railway and the train services are operated by Trenitalia and Trenord.

== Train services ==
The station is served by the following services:

- Regional services (Treno regionale) Brescia - Desanzano del Garda - Peschiera del Garda - Verona
- Regional services (Treno regionale) Brescia - Verona - Vicenza - Padua - Venice (1x per day)

== See also ==
- History of rail transport in Italy
- List of railway stations in Lombardy
- Rail transport in Italy
- Railway stations in Italy
