= San Bonifacio =

San Bonifacio San Bonifaso (Venetian)
- Comune
- Comune di San Bonifacio
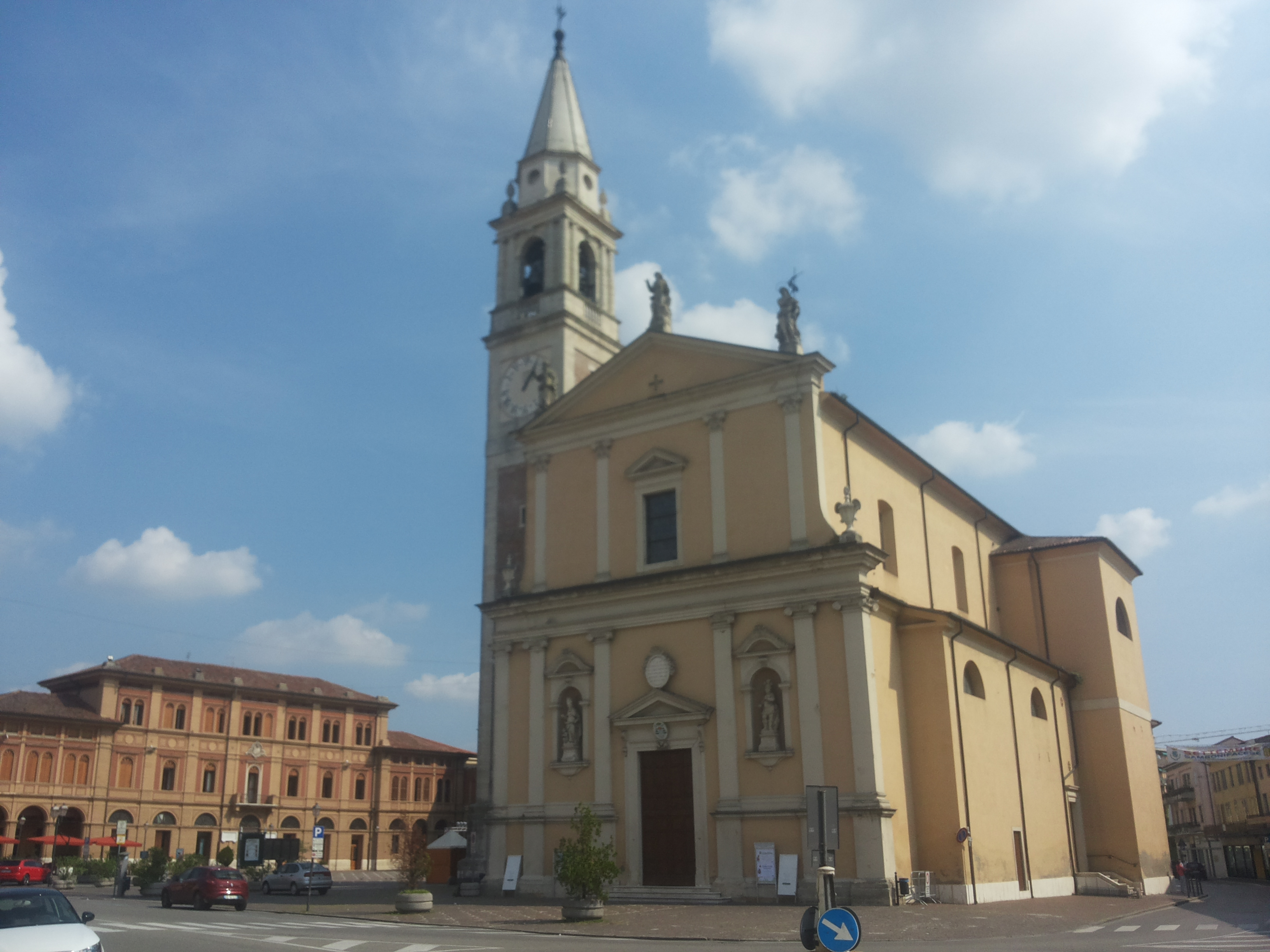

- Coat of arms

- Location within Italy Location within Veneto
- Coordinates: 45°24′N 11°17′E
- Country: Italy
- Region: Veneto
- Province: Verona (VR)
- Frazioni: Lobia, Locara, Prova, Villabella, Villanova

Government
  - Mayor: Leonardo Frigo ( Centre-right coalition: Brothers of Italy, Forza Italia, Libero Patto Sambonifacese, A Difesa del Territorio! from June 8, 2026)

Area
  - Total: 33.79 km^{2} (13.05 sq mi)
- Elevation: 31 m (102 ft)

Population (December 31, 2015)
  - Total: 21,284
  - Density: 629.9/km^{2} (1,631/sq mi)
- Demonym: Sambonifacesi
- Time zone: UTC+1 (CET)
  - Summer (DST): UTC+2 (CEST)
- Postal code: 37047, 37040 frazioni
- Dialing code: 045
- Patron saint: Saint Boniface
- Saint day: June 5
- Website: Official website

San Bonifacio (Venetian: San Bonifaso) is a comune (municipality) in the Province of Verona in the Italian region Veneto, located about 80 kilometres (50 mi) west of Venice and about 25 kilometres (16 mi) east of Verona.

San Bonifacio borders the following municipalities: Arcole, Belfiore, Gambellara, Lonigo, Monteforte d'Alpone, and Soave.

== Main sights ==
- Abbey of St. Peter, founded in the 7th century. It is a Romanesque church with an apse and two aisles. Notable are the crypt and the imposing bell tower, dating to 1131.
- Cathedral (12th century, but mostly rebuilt in 1437)
- Church of St. Abondius (15th century)

== People ==
- Germano Mosconi (1932–2012), journalist
- Davide Rebellin (1971–2022), road bicycle racer

== Economy ==
Historically, one of the town's industrial icons was Perlini, a company founded in 1957, producing large off-road dump trucks used in mining and heavy construction worldwide. Although the original company went through financial difficulties and was later restructured, its legacy remains an important part of San Bonifacio's economic history.

Among the most prominent realities is Ferroli, a historic company founded in 1955, which manufactures heating systems. With a significant international presence, Ferroli has long been one of the industrial cornerstones of the town. Another key player is Pedrollo, a manufacturer of electric water pumps, which has contributed to San Bonifacio's reputation for precision engineering and exports its products to more than 160 countries.

Also present is Alfa Laval, which recently opened a facility in the town dedicated to the production of brazed plate heat exchangers. Pakelo Motor Oil produces lubricants used in various sectors including automotive, agriculture, and food processing.

== Transport ==
- San Bonifacio railway station
