= Monselice railway station =

Railway station in Italy

Monselice
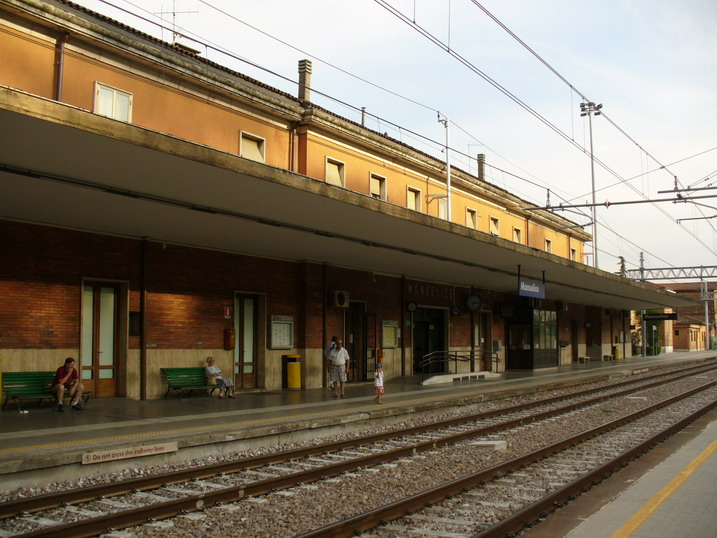
- Monselice railway station

General information
- Location: Via Trento e Trieste 60; Monselice; Monselice, Padua, Veneto; Italy
- Coordinates: 45°14′48″N 11°44′54″E
- Owner: Rete Ferroviaria Italiana
- Operator: Centostazioni
- Lines: Padova–Bologna; Mantova–Monselice
- Train operators: Trenitalia

Other information
- Classification: Silver

History
- Opened: 11 June 1866; 160 years ago
Location
- Location within Veneto Location within Northern Italy Location within Italy

Monselice railway station (Italian: Stazione di Monselice) is a railway station serving the town of Monselice, in the Veneto region, northeastern Italy.

The station opened in 1866 and lies on the Padua–Bologna and Mantova–Monselice railway lines.

== Train services ==
The following services call at the station:

- Intercity services (Intercity) Rome - Florence - Bologna - Padua - Venice - Trieste
- Night train (Intercity Night) Rome - Bologna - Padua - Venice - Trieste
- Express services (Regionale Veloce) Bologna - Ferrara - Rovigo - Padua - Venice
- Regional services (Treno regionale) Bologna - Ferrara - Rovigo - Padua - Venice
- Local services (Treno regionale) Mantua - Nogara - Legnago - Monselice (- Venice)

== See also ==
- History of rail transport in Italy
- List of railway stations in Veneto
- Rail transport in Italy
- Railway stations in Italy
