= Anconetta railway station =

Railway station in Vicenza, Italy

Anconetta
- Anconetta railway station

General information
- Location: Vicenza, Vicenza, Veneto; Italy
- Coordinates: 45°33′53″N 11°34′05″E
- Owner: Rete Ferroviaria Italiana
- Line: Vicenza–Schio railway
- Platforms: 1
- Train operators: Trenitalia

Other information
- Classification: Bronze

History
- Opened: 24 May 1998
Location
- Location within Veneto Location within Northern Italy Location within Italy

Anconetta (Italian: Stazione di Anconetta) is a railway station in the Italian city of Vicenza, in the Veneto region. The station lies on the Vicenza–Schio railway and the train services are operated by Trenitalia.

== Train services ==
The station is served by the following service(s):

- Local services (Treno regionale) Vicenza - Thiene - Schio
