= Mogliano Veneto =

Mogliano Veneto Mogian (Venetian)
- Comune
- Città di Mogliano Veneto
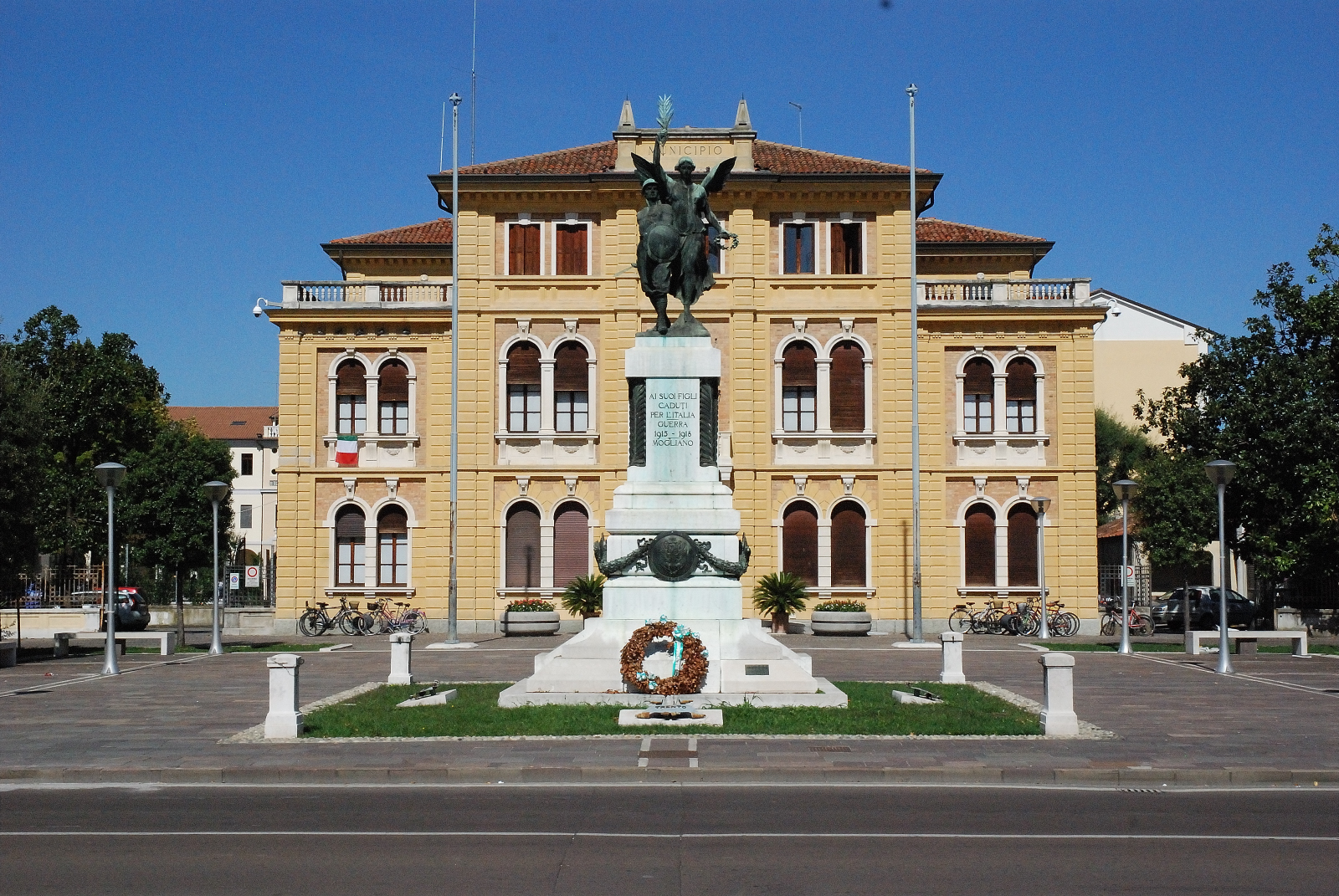
- War Memorial and City Hall

- Coat of arms

- Location within Italy Location within Veneto
- Coordinates: 45°34′43″N 12°14′11″E
- Country: Italy
- Region: Veneto
- Province: Treviso (TV)
- Frazioni: Bonisiolo, Campocroce, Marocco, Mazzocco, Zerman

Government
  - Mayor: Carola Arena (PD)

Area
  - Total: 46.15 km^{2} (17.82 sq mi)
- Elevation: 8 m (26 ft)

Population (30 November 2008)
  - Total: 28,082
  - Density: 608.5/km^{2} (1,576/sq mi)
- Demonym: Moglianesi
- Time zone: UTC+1 (CET)
  - Summer (DST): UTC+2 (CEST)
- Postal code: 31021
- Dialing code: 041
- Patron saint: Santa Maria Assunta
- Saint day: August 15
- Website: Official website

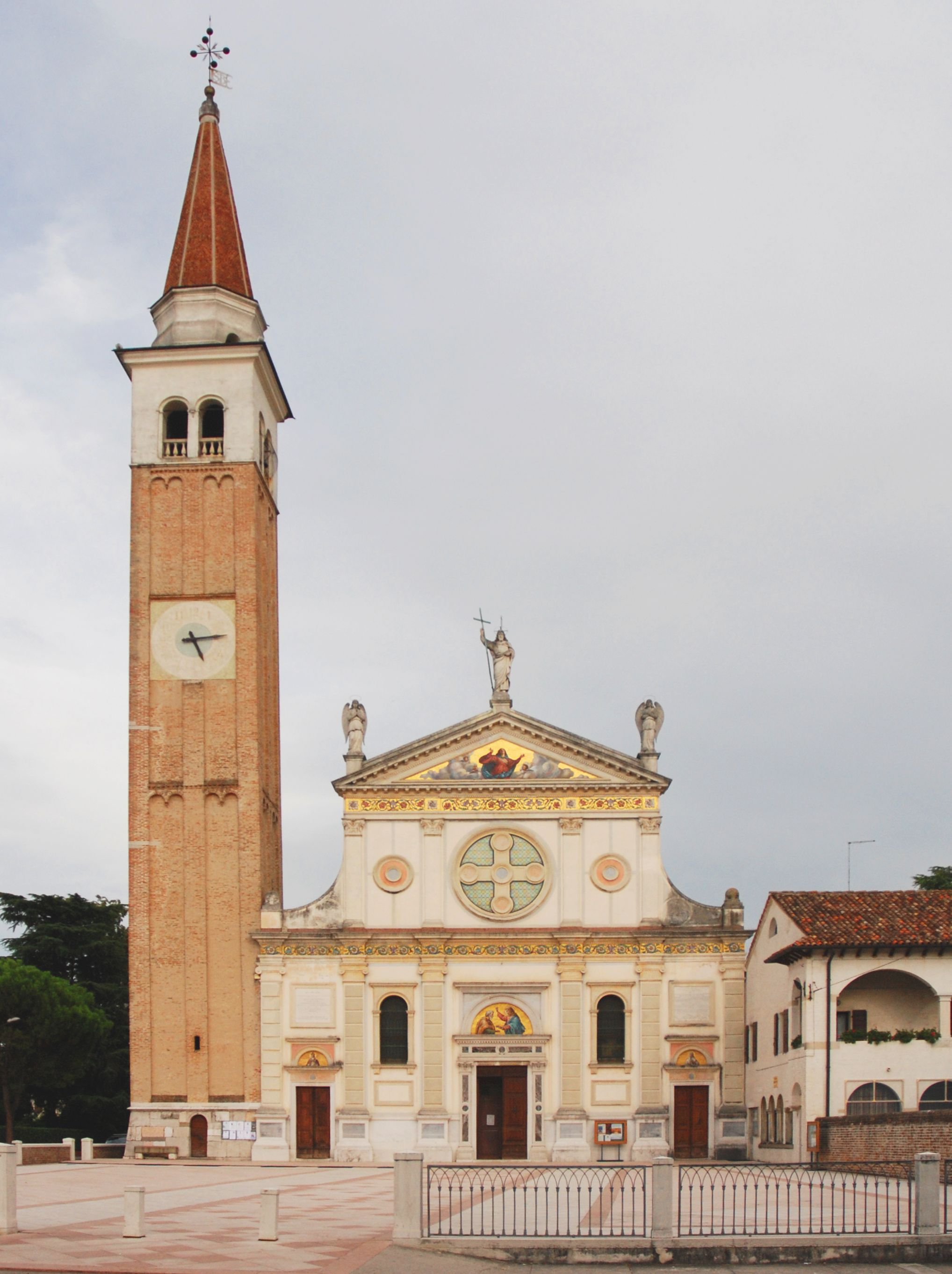
Church of Santa Maria Assunta, in the centre of the town

Mogliano Veneto (Venetian: Mogian [moˈdʒaŋ]) is a town and comune in the province of Treviso, Veneto, northern Italy, located halfway between Mestre (Venice) and Treviso.

== Culture ==
Mogliano Veneto Is the birthplace of the novel writer Giuseppe Berto and the lyric soprano Toti Dal Monte. A Literary award is entitled to Berto and is given every year by a local committee to the best first work written in Italian.

== Transport ==
Mogliano is cut in two by a busy street, known as Terraglio, a historical road linking Treviso and Mestre/Venice. Mogliano Veneto railway station is on the busy Venice–Udine railway and, like Mestre, serves as a dormitory town for people working in the surrounding industrial areas. Train services operate to Venice, Treviso, Udine and Trieste.

== Twin towns ==
- Ricadi, Italy
- Lisieux, France
- (Bosnia and Herzegovina) Mostar, Bosnia-Herzegovina

== Sports ==
Football

F.C. Union Pro Mogliano-Preganziol A.S.D. is the Italian football team of the city and of Preganziol and was founded in 2012 after the merge of A.S.D. Pro Mogliano Calcio (founded in 1928) and ASD Union Preganziol (founded in 1962). Currently it plays in Italy's Serie D after the promotion from Eccellenza Veneto Girone B in the 2013–14 season.

Its home ground is Stadio Comunale with 2,300 seats of the city. The team's colors are white and blue.

Rugby

Mogliano Rugby is the local rugby team. They compete in Serie A Elite, the top tier competition in Italy at the national level. They have won the national title in 2012-13 and the 2023-24 Serie A Elite Cup.

They play at the Stadio Maurizio Quaggia.
