= Preganziol =

- Comune
- Città di Preganziol
- Coat of arms

- Location within Italy Location within Veneto
- Coordinates: 45°36′N 12°14′E
- Country: Italy
- Region: Veneto
- Province: Treviso (TV)
- Frazioni: Frescada, Sambughè, San Trovaso

Government
  - Mayor: Elena Stocco

Area
  - Total: 22.9 km^{2} (8.8 sq mi)
- Elevation: 12 m (39 ft)

Population (31-12-2024)
  - Total: 16,759
  - Density: 732/km^{2} (1,900/sq mi)
- Demonym: Preganziolese(i)
- Time zone: UTC+1 (CET)
  - Summer (DST): UTC+2 (CEST)
- Postal code: 31022
- Dialing code: 0422
- Website: Official website

Preganziol is a comune (municipality) in the Province of Treviso in the Italian region Veneto, located about 20 kilometres (12 mi) northwest of Venice and about 8 kilometres (5 mi) south of Treviso. As of 31-12-2024, it had a population of 16,759 and an area of 22.9 square kilometres (8.8 mi^{2}).

Preganziol borders the following municipalities: Casale sul Sile, Casier, Mogliano Veneto, Treviso, Zero Branco.
