= Mantua–Monselice railway =

Overview
- Owner: RFI
- Termini: Mantua; Monselice

Technical
- Line length: 84.1 km (52.3 mi)

The Mantua-Monselice railway is a secondary railway line that runs along the Po Valley and connects Mantua, in Lombardy, with the Venetian town of Monselice, whose station is located on the Padua-Bologna railway.

== History ==
Tratta	Inaugurazione
Cerea-Legnago	August 6, 1877
Monselice-Montagnana	May 16, 1885
Mantua-Cerea	March 27, 1886
Legnago-Montagnana	December 31, 1886

The first references to the construction of a railway that would connect Sant'Elena di Este to Legnago passing through Montagnana and Pressana can be found in some documents dating back to 1865. Numerous projects and variations followed. Towards the end of 1871, the concessionaire company of the Mantua-Modena railway, authorised by the Ministry of Public Works, carried out some surveys for a railway that would also lead from Mantua to Legnago and Este, connecting to the Padua-Bologna line. This last project attracted the interest of Padua on the one hand, because it would connect to the territories of its lower province and to the Montagnana hemp district, and on the other, of Mantua, which wanted a connection to the city of Padua and to Venice. The project was discussed on 1 December 1872 in Rome, at the competent ministry.

Despite the fact that the law of 29 June 1873, n. 1475 contemplated its construction, until 1878 there was no further progress on the project, so much so that this silence gave rise to a long series of interventions in the Chamber of Deputies which were proposed by some parliamentarians linked to the territory crossed by the railway.
