= Monselice =

Monselice Monséłexe (Venetian)
- Comune
- Comune di Monselice
- Coat of arms

- Location within Italy Location within Veneto
- Coordinates: 45°14′N 11°45′E
- Country: Italy
- Region: Veneto
- Province: Padua (PD)
- Frazioni: Marendole, Monticelli, Ca' Oddo, San Cosma, San Bortolo, Carmine

Government
  - Mayor: Franco Ennio (centre-left coalition)

Area
  - Total: 50 km^{2} (19 sq mi)
- Elevation: 9 m (30 ft)

Population (31-09-2014)
  - Total: 18,682
  - Density: 370/km^{2} (970/sq mi)
- Demonym: Monselicensi
- Time zone: UTC+1 (CET)
  - Summer (DST): UTC+2 (CEST)
- Postal code: 35043
- Dialing code: 0429
- Saint day: November 2
- Website: Official website

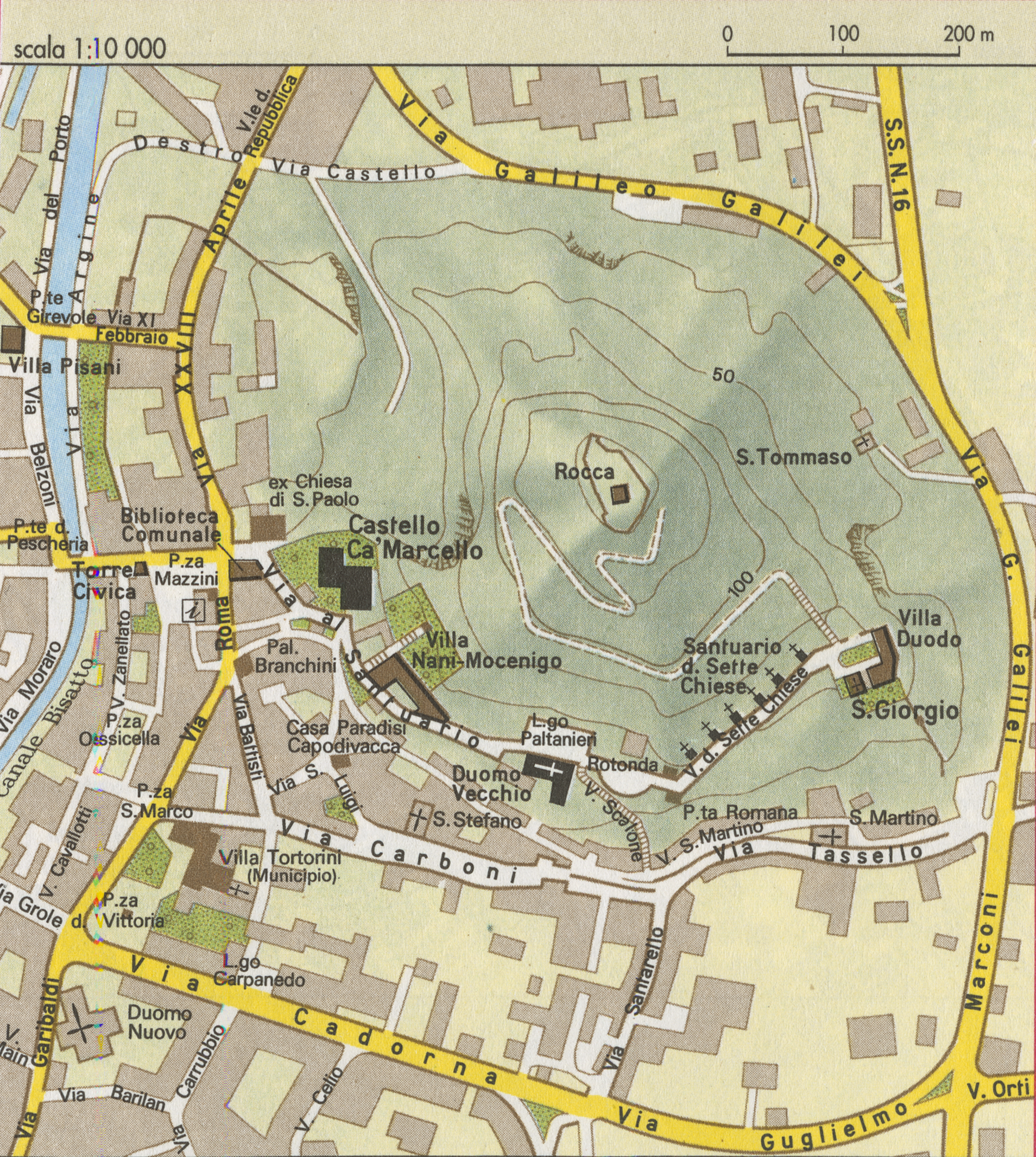
Map of the city

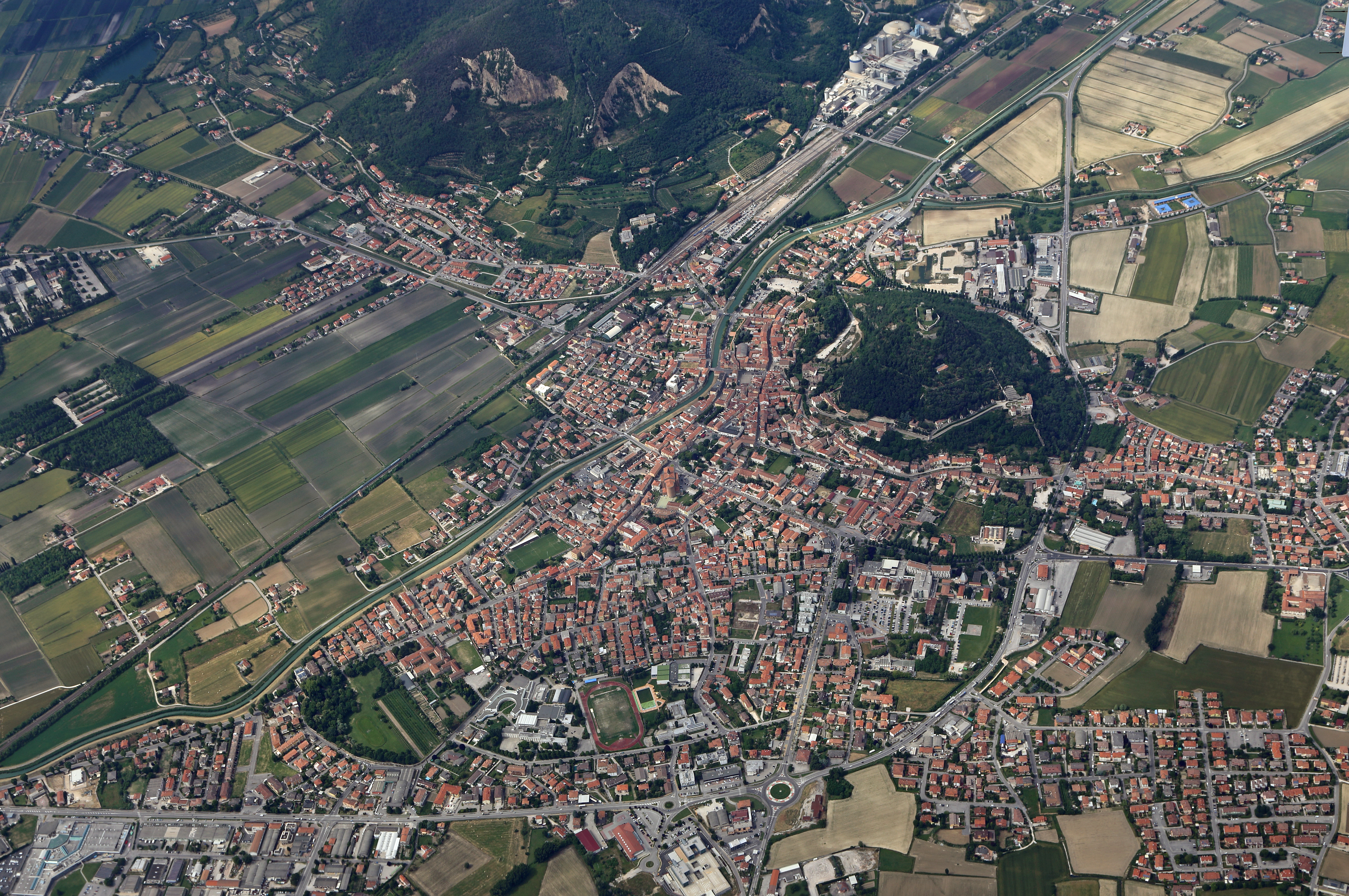
Monselice: aerial view

Monselice (Italian pronunciation: [monˈseːlitʃe]; Venetian: Monséłexe [moŋˈseɰeze]) is a town and municipality (comune) located in northeastern Italy, in the Veneto region, in the province of Padua about 20 kilometres (12 mi) southwest of the city of Padua, at the southern edge of the Euganean Hills (Colli Euganei).

Monselice is the most picturesque town I have seen in Italy. It has an old ruin of a castle upon the hill and thence commands a beautiful and extraordinary view. It lies in the wide plain – a dead level – whereon Ferrara, Bologna, Rovigo, Este, Padua stand and even Venice we could dimly see in the horizon rising with her tiara of proud towers. What a walk and what a wide delightful picture. To Venice 38 miles. Ralph Waldo Emerson Journals (31 May 1833)

== History ==
The town's mythological foundation is attributed to the Trojan hero Opsicella. The area shows evidence of human settlement since the Bronze Age.

In Roman times it was known as Mons Silicis, meaning "mountain of flintstone", possibly due to the local quarries of trachyte.

The earliest known documents about Monselice date back to 568 AD and are related to the conquest of the town by the Lombards. The town was under Byzantine rule for a brief period until its conquest by king Agilulf around 602.

During the Comuni period (12th century) the town had its own local self-government. The town was aligned with the Ghibellines against the Guelphs in the political and military fights of the 13th century.

The Ghibelline leader Ezzelino III da Romano improved the town's fortifications and made it one of the main strongholds of the area.

The town was then under the rule of the Carraresi (the lords of Padua) and in the 15th century it became part of the Republic of Venice.

After a short period of French domination, it was part of the Austrian Empire and, later, of its client Kingdom of Lombardy–Venetia.

In 1866 it became part of the Kingdom of Italy.

== Main sights ==
Monselice - Panorama.

The modern town lies in a wide valley between the Montericco, elevation 312 metres (1,024 ft), and the Rocca, elevation 110 metres (360 ft), hills (part of the Euganean Hills).

The oldest part of the town lies around the Rocca hill.

In medieval times the Rocca was heavily fortified with five girdle walls that are partially still visible today.

Important points for tourists can be the central square Piazza Mazzini with the medieval Torre Civica (Civic Tower) and the Palazzo del Monte di Pietà (Public Pawn Palace). This building hosts the local tourist promotion board (Pro Loco), which provides information for visits to the town's historical attractions.

Piazza Mazzini square is also the starting point for the promenade walk along Via del Santuario, leading to the most interesting sites of the town, which include:

- The Castle of Monselice (or Castello Cini), which houses one of the most important collections of European medieval weapons and armour.
- Villa Nani
- The Romanesque church of Santa Giustina (12th century).
- The Seven Churches Sanctuary (Santuario delle Sette Chiese or Via Romana) with paintings by Palma il Giovane. Pietro Duodo (1554–1610), a Venetian patrician, committed to architect Vincenzo Scamozzi the project for the Santuario delle Sette Chiese. In 1606, Pope Paul V issued a papal bull that granted to pilgrims visiting the Sanctuary the same Catholic indulgencies granted to pilgrims visiting the seven main churches (basiliche) of Rome, hence the Romanis basilicis pares inscription on the portal of the sanctuary.
- Villa Duodo, designed by Scamozzi.
- The Keep (Mastio or Torrione), still standing on the Rocca hilltop. It is a tower built with regular trachyte blocks from local quarries.

== Culture ==
A lively market is held every Monday in the town's main streets.

An important fair is traditionally held every year around 1 November (All Saints Day - saint patron day for the town). Attractions include a food and general market, local food stands, a fun park, and exhibits.

Started in recent years, the "Palio di Monselice" tournament has become a primary attraction. The Palio is held every year in September. It is modeled after medieval horse tournaments and it includes several other competitions: archery, chess tournament (also in the form of human chess), musicians tournament (with tambourines and "chiarine"), flag-flyers, millstone challenge and the parade of nine "contrade" in period costume.

== Transportation ==
Monselice is well connected to the major towns of Padua, Venice and Bologna.

Monselice railway station is on the Venice-Padua-Bologna-Florence line, between Padua (North) and Bologna (South). A secondary railway line connects Monselice to the town of Mantua in Lombardy.

The nearest airports are Marco Polo, Venice (VCE), 60 kilometres (37 mi) away, and Marconi, Bologna (BLQ), 100 kilometres (62 mi).

== Twin towns ==
Monselice is twinned with:

- Città della Speranza Foundation, Italy, since 2006
- Poreč, Croatia, since 2010
- Niepołomice, Poland, since 2011
- Parkano, Finland, since 2015
