= Lonigo =

- Comune
- Comune di Lonigo
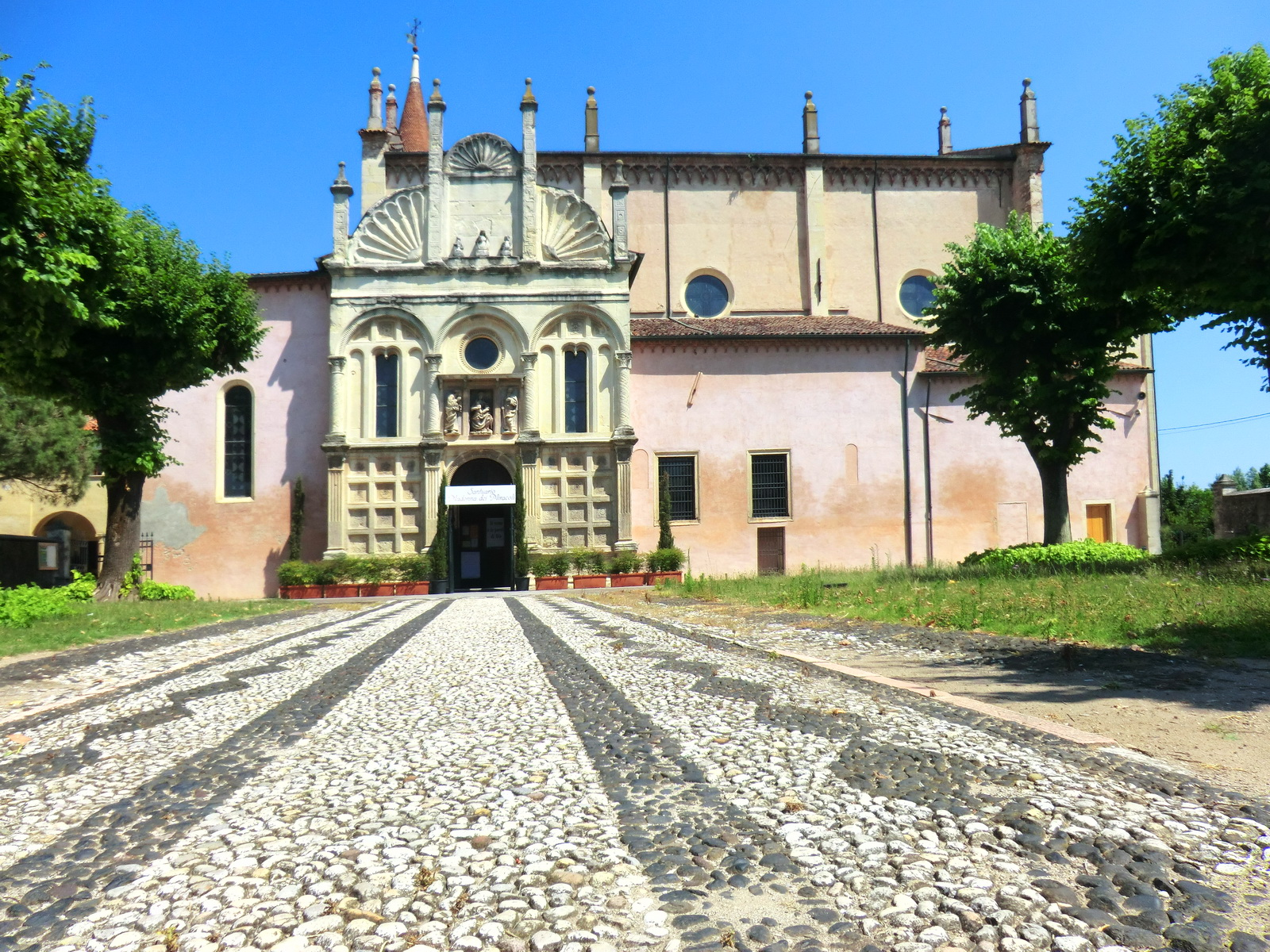
- Sanctuary of Madonna dei Miracoli

- Coat of arms

- Location within Italy Location within Veneto
- Coordinates: 45°23′0″N 11°23′0″E
- Country: Italy
- Region: Veneto
- Province: Vicenza (VI)
- Frazioni: Almisano, Bagnolo, Lobia Vicentina, Madonna, Monticello

Government
  - Mayor: Pierluigi Giacomello from 25-05-2026 ( Centre-right coalition: Brothers of Italy, Lega- Liga Veneta, Lonigo Veramente, Con Giacomello per Lonigo)

Area
  - Total: 49 km^{2} (19 sq mi)
- Elevation: 31 m (102 ft)

Population (30 September 2017)
  - Total: 16,441
  - Density: 340/km^{2} (870/sq mi)
- Demonym: Leoniceni
- Time zone: UTC+1 (CET)
  - Summer (DST): UTC+2 (CEST)
- Postal code: 36045
- Dialing code: 0444
- Patron saint: Sts. Quirico and Giulitta
- Saint day: March 25
- Website: Official website

Lonigo is a town and comune in the province of Vicenza, Veneto, northern Italy, its population counts around 16,400 inhabitants.

In its frazione of Bagnolo is the Villa Pisani, a Renaissance patrician villa designed by Andrea Palladio, which is part of a World Heritage Site. Another villa in the comune, Rocca Pisana, was designed by Vincenzo Scamozzi.

Outside the town is the church and complex of the 16th-century Sanctuary of Madonna dei Miracoli.

== Transport ==
- Lonigo railway station

== Twin towns ==
Lonigo is twinned with:

- Abensberg, Germany, since 1999

== Sport ==
Lonigo is well known for motorcycle speedway and has a stadium known as the Santa Marina Stadium, which is a 5,000-capacity venue. Lonigo had previously had another speedway venue from 1947 to 1972.

== Notable people ==
- Mei Zhanchun (1864–1923), Franciscan Order Roman Catholic priest

== See also ==
- Speedway Grand Prix of Italy
