= Sistemi Territoriali =

Italian railway company

Sistemi Territoriali S.p.A.
- Type: Società per azioni
- Founded: 1 April 2002
- Defunct: 16 December 2024
- Successor: Infrastrutture Venete
- Headquarters: Padua, Italy
- Area served: Veneto, Italy
- Products: Public transport Passenger railway transport
- Website: sistemiterritorialispa.it/ferroviaria/index.asp

Sistemi Territoriali (ST) is a private transport company of Italy. The company is owned by the region of Veneto.

From 1 April 2002 the company took over the management of some regional railway lines and the train services on these lines. Before this date the company was known as Ferrovie Venete It was issued with a licence as a Railway Undertaking and a Safety Certificate for both passenger and freight trains. Since 1 October 2005 the company has been responsible for the maintenance and management of some inland shipping routes.

The company is also responsible for some buses.

== Railway services ==
ST owns and operates one railway line, the Adria–Mestre railway.

ST operates a number of routes for Trenitalia. These are:

- Rovigo-Chioggia
- Rovigo - Legnago - Verona Porta Nuova
- Vicenza - Cervignano del Friuli
- Vicenza - Grisignano di Zocco
- Vicenza - Rovigo
- Rovigo - Arquà - Polesella
- Rovigo - Costa
- Rovigo - Cavanella Po - Raccordo AIA
- Vicenza - Verona Porta Nuova Scalo
- Vicenza - Altavilla
- Vicenza - Thiene
- Venice Marghera Scalo - Chioggia - Porta di Chioggia
- Venice Marghera Scalo - Pontelongo - Raccordo Italia Zuccheri
- Venice Marghera Scalo - Padua Campo Marte

== Fleet ==
Class	Image	Cars per set	Type	Top speed		Number	Builder	Built
Class	Image	Cars per set	Type	km/h	mph	Number	Builder	Built
ALn 663		1	Diesel multiple unit	90	56	5	Omeca	1991-1993
ALn 668.1000		1	Diesel multiple unit	88	55	4	Omeca	1979-1980
ATR 110		2	Diesel multiple unit	140	87	3	Stadler	2006, 2012-2013
ATR 120 & 126		4	Diesel multiple unit	140	87	5	Stadler	2006, 2012-2013
ETR 340		4	Electric multiple unit	160	99	4	Stadler	2008, 2013-2014
ETR 360		6	Electric multiple unit	160	99	4	Stadler, AnsaldoBreda	2012
DE 424		N/A	Diesel locomotive	50	31	3	TIBB/OM	1957-1958
D.753		N/A	Diesel locomotive	100	62	7	CKD	1973-1976
E.483		N/A	Electric locomotive	140	87	2	Bombardier	2009

== See also ==
- Società Veneta
