= Padua–Bologna railway =

Railway line in Italy

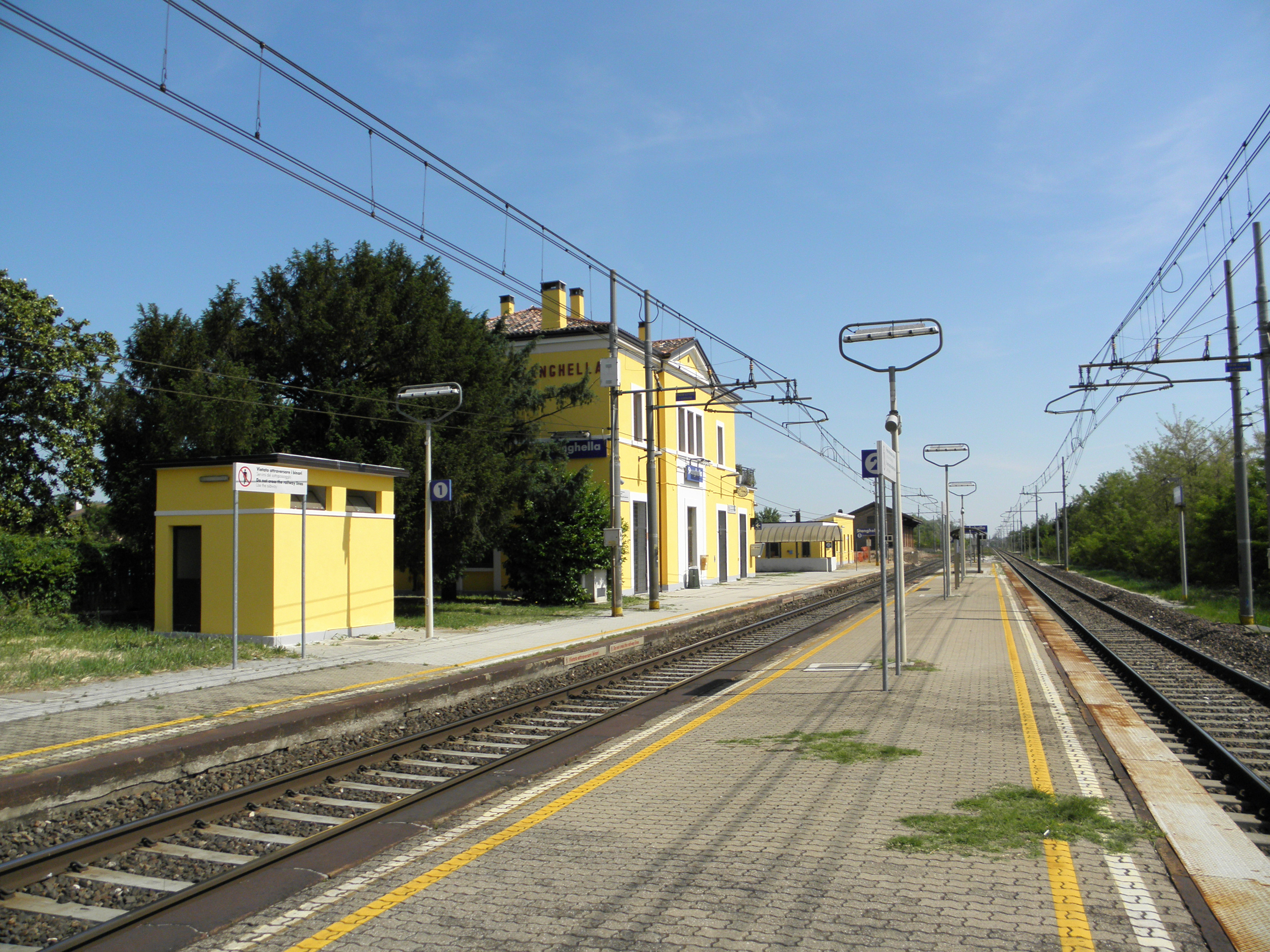
- Stanghella station

Overview
- Native name: Ferrovia Padova-Bologna
- Status: Operational
- Owner: RFI
- Line number: 58, 86
- Locale: Italy
- Termini: Padua; Bologna

Service
- Type: Heavy rail
- Operator(s): Trenitalia

History
- Opened: 1862–6

Technical
- Line length: 123 km (76 mi)
- Number of tracks: 2
- Track gauge: 1,435 mm (4 ft 8 1/2 in) standard gauge
- Electrification: 3000 V DC

The Padua–Bologna railway is an important railway line in Italy that joins the city of Padua to Bologna, passing through Rovigo and Ferrara. The infrastructure is managed by RFI, which classifies it as a primary line.

== History ==
Section	Opened
Bologna–Ferrara	26 January 1862
Ferrara–Pontelagoscuro	15 April 1862
Padua–Rovigo	11 June 1866
Rovigo–Pontelagoscuro	1 December 1866

The railway was designed as a continuation of the Porrettana Railway towards the Po Valley and Venice.

The first section from Ferrara to Bologna was opened in January 1862, while Pontelagoscuro was reached on 15 April of the same year.

The Padua–Rovigo section, which at that time was in the Veneto region and part of the Austrian Empire, was opened on 11 June 1866, a few days before the opening of hostilities in the Third War of Independence. The missing section, from Pontelagoscuro to Rovigo, was built as a matter of urgency during the war. Civil operations started on 1 December 1866, when the war had ended and the Veneto had become part of the Kingdom of Italy. The whole line was managed by the Società per le Ferrovie dell'Alta Italia (SFAI) until the establishment of the Rete Adriatica in 1885. The line has been part of the FS network since 1905, while management was transferred to RFI in 2001. On 22 December 1985, a rail crash occurred at Coronella (a village in Poggio Renatico), which caused 10 deaths and injuries to another 11. The line has been completely doubled and electrified since 2006 with the completion of the doubling of the Pontelagoscuro–Occhiobello section.

== Track standards ==
The line is equipped with double track, 1,435 mm (4 ft 8 1/2 in) standard gauge and electrified at 3000 V DC.
