= Cerea =

- Comune
- Città di Cerea
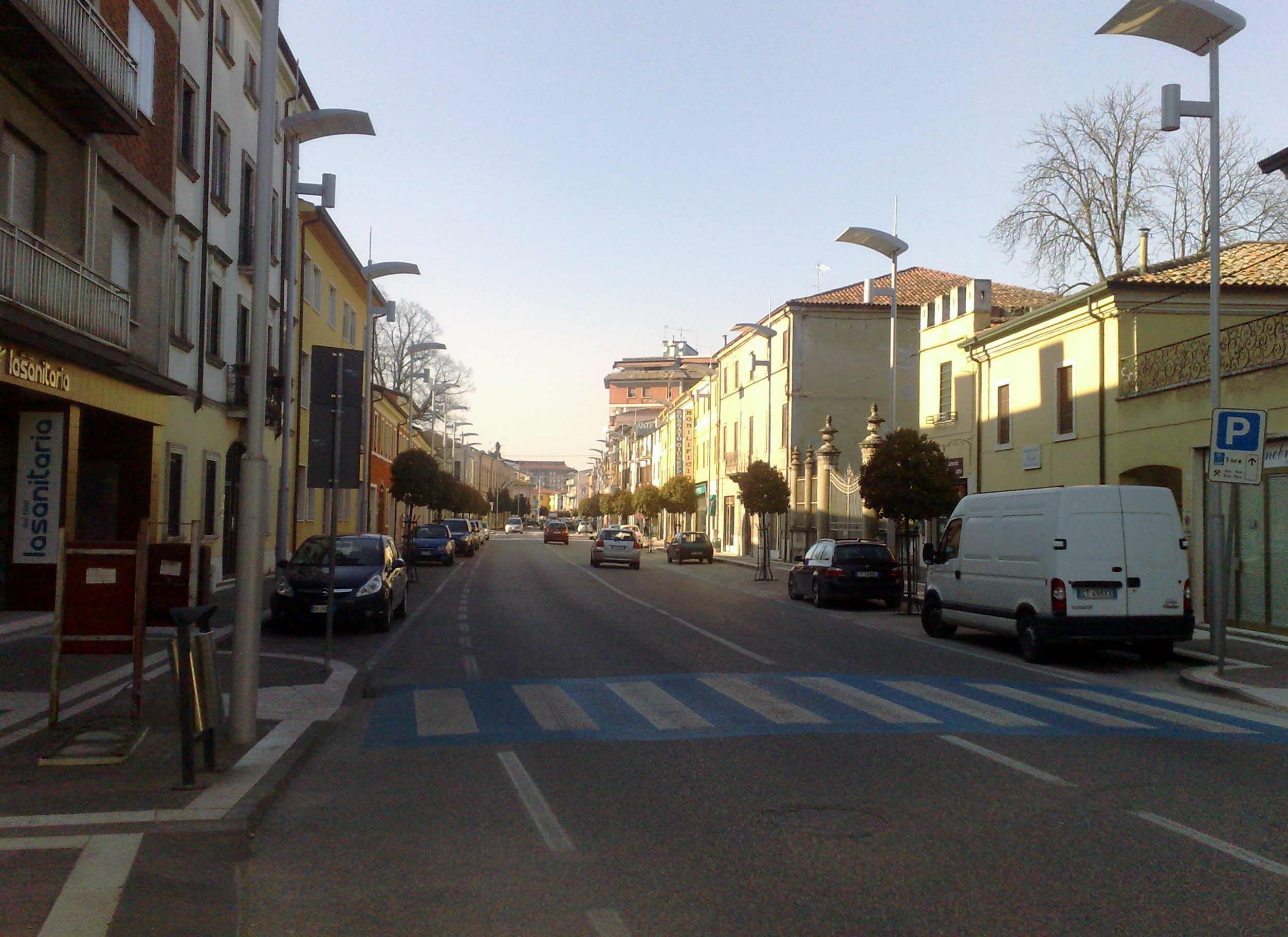

- Coat of arms

- Location within Italy Location within Veneto
- Coordinates: 45°12′N 11°13′E
- Country: Italy
- Region: Veneto
- Province: Verona (VR)
- Frazioni: Asparetto, Aselogna, Cà del Lago, Cherubine, Palesella e Santa Teresa in Valle

Government
  - Mayor: Marco Franzoni

Area
  - Total: 70.4 km^{2} (27.2 sq mi)
- Elevation: 18 m (59 ft)

Population (31 December 2007)
  - Total: 16,018
  - Density: 228/km^{2} (589/sq mi)
- Demonym: Cereani or Ceretani
- Time zone: UTC+1 (CET)
  - Summer (DST): UTC+2 (CEST)
- Postal code: 37053
- Dialing code: 0442
- Patron saint: St. Zeno of Verona
- Saint day: 12 April
- Website: Official website

Cerea is a town and comune in the province of Verona, Veneto, northern Italy.

== History ==
From 923 AD until 1223 Cerea was a castrum (fortification). On 1223 Cerea it became a "comune" but, a year after, it was plundered because of the war between Mantua and Verona. A period of decadence followed, also because of the frequent epidemics. In the 18th century, under the Venetian rule, Cerea began to grow and the noblemen started building their villas.

Classic furniture in Cerea has a long and rich history. Cerea started manufacturing art furniture during the Twenties in the Asparetto suburb. Here, a "marangon" (artisan), Giuseppe Merlin, was hired by Ing. Bresciani to restore an ancient piece of furniture from the 600 century. He then moved on to reproduce furniture from older ages faithfully. He and other artisans expanded and now Cerea has more than 500 furniture factories, 95% of which are still handcraft shops.

== Geography ==
=== Territory ===
The city of Cerea is located in the heart of the Bassa Veronese plain. It is located south-east of the capital city of Verona, which is 34 kilometers away.

It is also close to the cities of Mantua and Rovigo. The city is home to a small nature reserve called the Brusà marsh. It is also crossed by the Menago river. It includes six hamlets: Aselogna, Asparetto, Cherubine, Palesella, Santa Teresa and San Vito Martire.

=== Climate ===
The climate, like that of the entire Veneto plain, is continental. In summer the temperatures are high while in winter they are frigid. The relative humidity is high throughout the year, especially in the winter months, when it causes fog, which occurs mostly from sunset until late morning.

== Origin of the name ==
The hypotheses on the origin of the name are different, multiple and varied.

According to some, it derives from the Latin cerrus, "cerro" with the addition of the suffix -etum. "Cerro" refers to the Fagaceae tree (Quercus cerris), an oak with deciduous, oblong, deeply lobed leaves, and with acorn-shaped fruits with characteristic domes covered in scales (similar to sea urchins). It is no coincidence that Cerea is also known for its wooden furniture. There is a historical document from 932 AD, which cites a decree by the archdeacon Epirando which allows the inhabitants of Acereta seu Cerete to rebuild the houses of the village. The name Acereta seu Cerete probably derives from the cerro, a very widespread tree in the area and symbol of the municipality.

== Sports ==
- A.S.D. Cerea 1912 football club
