= Milan–Venice railway =

Main line railway in Northern Italy

Milan-Venice railway
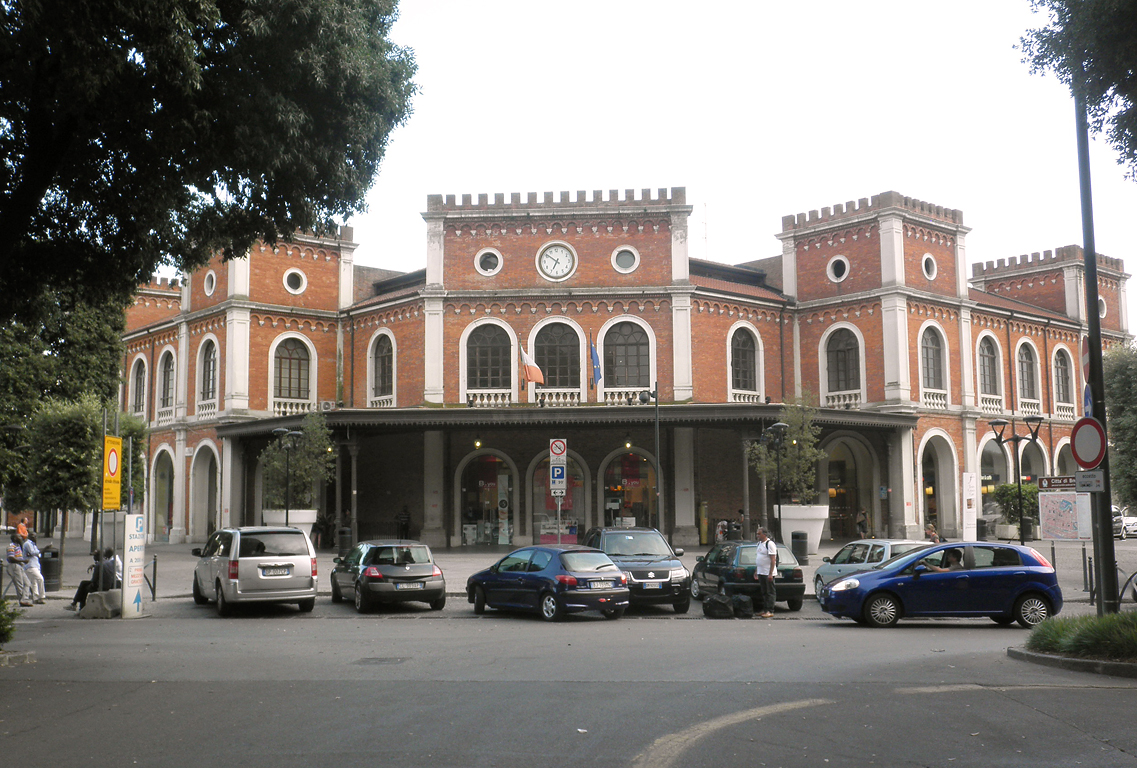
- Brescia station

Overview
- Native name: Ferrovia Milano-Venezia
- Status: operational
- Owner: RFI
- Locale: Italy
- Termini: Milan; Venice

Service
- Type: heavy rail
- Services: S5, S6, R4, RE6
- Operator(s): Trenord, Trenitalia

History
- Opened: 1842

Technical
- Track length: 267 km (166 mi)
- Number of tracks: 2
- Track gauge: 1,435 mm (4 ft 8 1/2 in)
- Electrification: Electrified at 3000 V DC

The Milan–Venice railway line is one of the most important railway lines in Italy. It connects the major city of Milan, in Lombardy, with the Adriatic Sea at Venice, in Veneto. The line is state-owned and operated by the state rail infrastructure company, Rete Ferroviaria Italiana that classifies it as a trunk line. The line is electrified at 3,000 volts DC.

== History ==
The line was designed by the Austrian Kingdom of Lombardy-Venetia to connect its two joint capitals and built by a company named the Imperiale Regia Privilege Strada ferrata Ferdinandea Lombardo-Veneta dell'Imperatore in honour of Ferdinand I of Austria. It was built in sections: the first section to be completed was between Padua and Marghera, opened on 13 December 1842, and was the third railway opened in Italy. On 13 January 1846 a 2-mile-long (3.2 km) bridge over the Venetian Lagoon between Mestre and Venice was opened, with 222 arches supported on 80,000 larch piles. It was followed by the opening of the Padua–Vicenza section on 11 January 1846 and the Milan–Treviglio section on 15 February 1846.

The First Italian War of Independence slowed construction of other sections: the Vicenza–Verona Porta Vescovo stretch was inaugurated on 3 July 1849; it was extended across the Adige river to Verona Porta Nuova on 14 December 1852. An extension followed to Brescia and Bergamo via Coccaglio on 22 April 1854. The line was completed with the opening of the section between Bergamo to Treviglio on 12 October 1857, following the inauguration of the bridge over the Oglio at Palazzolo. The original route via Treviglio, Bergamo and Brescia was 285 km (177 mi) long. The direct between Rovato and Treviglio, bypassing Bergamo was opened on 5 March 1878, and the line took its current form.

In 1852 the original operating company was taken over by the state, but it was privatised in 1856, being sold to the Rothschild banking family of France for 156.25 million gold francs to form the Societé IR Privilégiée des Chemins de Fer Lombards-Vénitiens et de l'Italie Centrale, with a concession to complete the Milan–Venice line and to extend it to Trieste (the Venice–Trieste line) and to build branches to Lake Maggiore (the beginning of the Milan-Domodossola line), Como (the Milan–Chiasso line), Pavia (the beginning of the Milan–Genoa line), Piacenza (the beginning of the Milan–Bologna line) and to Mantua and Borgoforte (the beginning of the Verona–Mantua–Modena line). The Rothschild's rail interests were collectively referred to as the Südbahn. With the transfer of Veneto to Italy as a result of the Third Italian War of Independence in 1866, the Milan–Venice railway became part of the Società per le strade ferrate dell'Alta Italia (Upper Italian Railways). In 1885 it became part of the Rete Adriatica (Adriatic Network) and in 1905 it was absorbed into Ferrovie dello Stato on its foundation.

Electrification at 3000 volts DC was completed in 1956.

== The current line ==
The railway is 267 kilometres (166 mi) long, double track and fully electrified. The most important cities passed are Brescia, Verona, Vicenza, Padua and Mestre: these are also the key interchange points with other public transport services. The line has four tracks between Milan Lambrate and Treviglio and between Padua and Venezia Mestre, including high-speed lines on those sections. The high speed pair of lines is referred to as DD (derived from "direttissima"—literally most direct—an Italian word for high-speed railway) and the other pair is referred to as the Linea Lenta (meaning "slow line", abbreviated LL). The high-speed line between Treviglio and Brescia was completed in December 2016 and planning for its extension from Brescia to Venice is under way.

The line is served by Trenitalia and Trenord regional trains between Milan and Verona and between Verona and Venice. The section from Pioltello to the Milan Cintura (belt) line is also served by trains of the S5 and S6 (starting from Treviglio) lines of the Milan Suburban Railway Network. The Padua–Venice section is also used by the lines of the Metropolitan Regional Rail System of the Veneto region. Long distance passenger traffic is served by Trenitalia Eurostar and Cisalpino trains. The railway is also used by freight trains operated by several railway companies.

== See also ==
- List of railway lines in Italy
