= Rovereto railway station =

Railway station in Rovereto, Italy

Rovereto
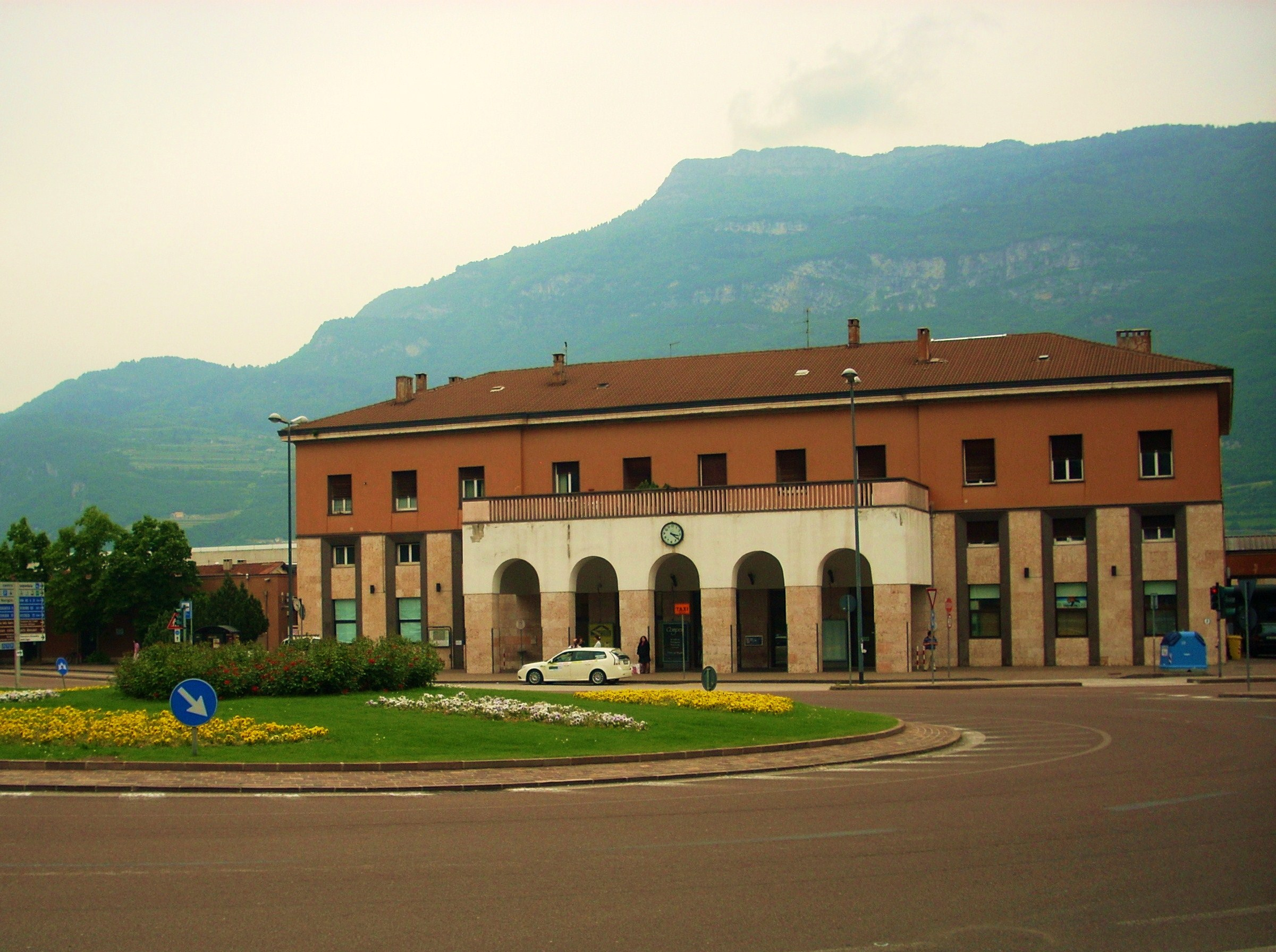
- The Piazzale and the passenger building

General information
- Location: Piazzale Paolo Orsi; 38068 Rovereto TN; Rovereto (TN), Trentino-Alto Adige/Südtirol; Italy
- Coordinates: 45°53′27″N 11°02′02″E
- Operator: Rete Ferroviaria Italiana; Centostazioni
- Line: Verona–Innsbruck
- Distance: 71.21 km (44.25 mi) from Verona Porta Vescovo
- Train operators: Trenitalia; ÖBB-DB
- Connections: Urban and interurban buses

Other information
- Classification: Gold

History
- Opened: 23 March 1859; 167 years ago
Location
- Location within Trentino-Alto Adige/Südtirol Location within Northern Italy Location within Italy

Rovereto railway station (Italian: Ferrovie Stazione di Rovereto) serves the Comune of Rovereto in the autonomous province of Trentino, northeastern Italy.

The station was opened in 1859 by the Austrian Empire's Südbahn and transferred to Italy in 1919. Rovereto station is located on the trans-Alpine Brenner Railway connecting Verona and Innsbruck.

The station is currently managed by Rete Ferroviaria Italiana (RFI). The commercial area of the passenger building, however, is managed by Centostazioni, whereas train services are operated by Trenitalia and ÖBB-DB.

== Location ==
Rovereto railway station is situated at Piazzale Paolo Orsi, the western edge and a five-minute walk to the city centre.

== History ==
The station was opened on 23 March 1859 upon the completion of the Trento-Ala section of the Brenner Railway.

Initial train operations were entrusted to the Austrian Empire's Südbahn (Imperial Royal Privileged Southern Railway Company of Austria, Venice and Central Italy / German: Kaiserlich königliche privilegierte Südbahngesellschaft).

After Austria-Hungary's defeat in the First World War, the Treaty of Saint-Germain-en-Laye (1919) rewarded Italy with annexation of County of Tyrol's territory south of the Brenner Pass. Ownership of all railway stations from Ala/Ahl-am-Etsch to Brenner, including Rovereto, were consequently transferred to Ferrovie dello Stato (FS).

== Features ==
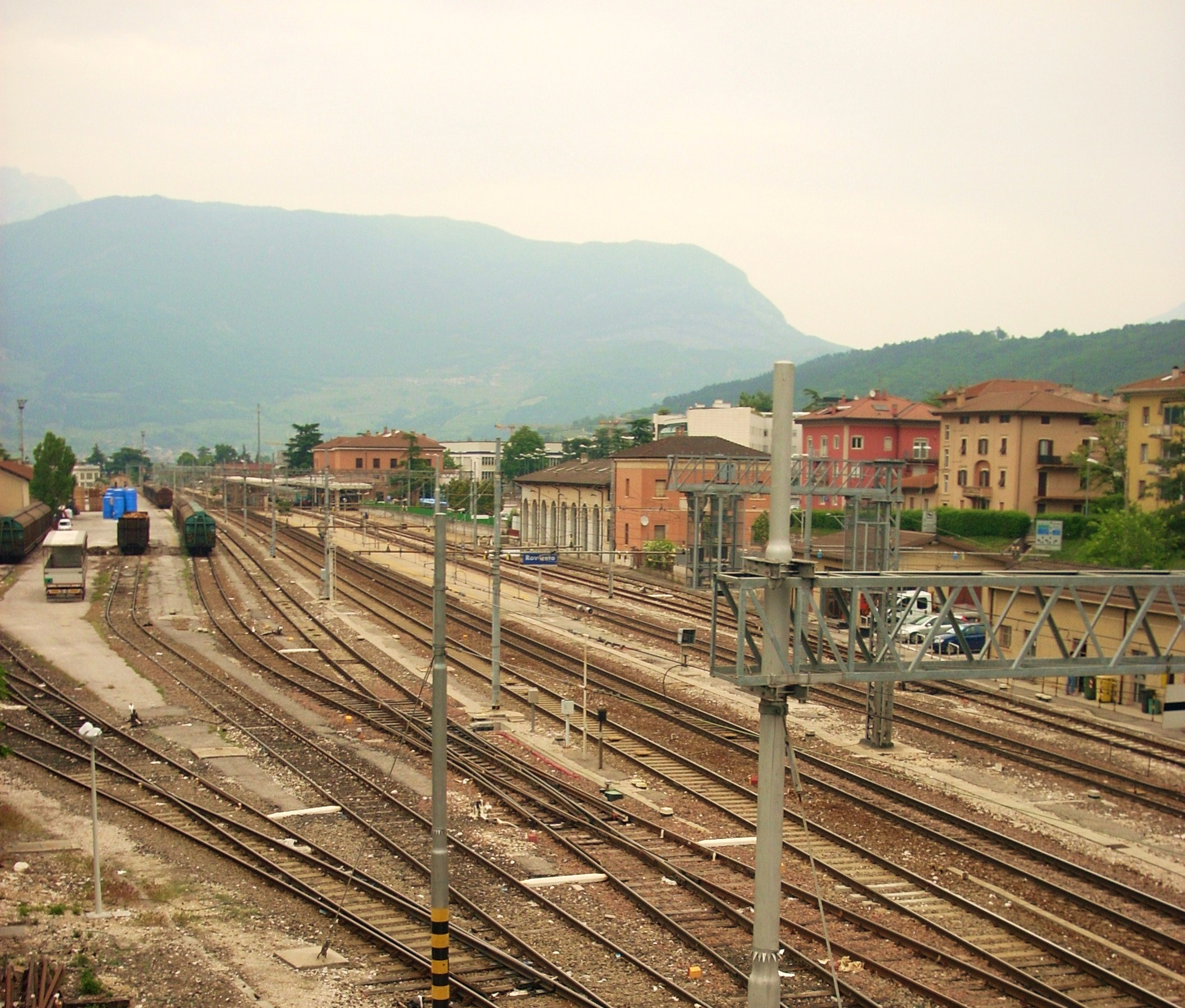
The station yard

The station has three tracks with platforms for passenger trains and additional tracks in the goods yard, which can be accessed by trucks and other vehicles from Via Zeni on the opposite side of the station building.

There have been plans to transfer the goods yard southwards to Mori railway aistation to make room for a larger, bifrontal station, thus providing access on both sides from Piazzale Orsi and Via Zeni.

== Train services ==
The station has about two million passenger movements per year and is therefore, in terms of passenger numbers, the third biggest within the region, after Bolzano/Bozen and Trento.

The following services call at this station:

Domestic

- High-speed train (Trenitalia Frecciargento) Bolzano/Bozen-Naples: Bolzano/Bozen - Trento/Trient - Rovereto/Rofreit - Verona - Bologna - Florence - Rome - (Naples)
- Regional train (Trenitalia Regional) Brennero/Brenner-Bologna: Brennero/Brenner - Vipiteno/Sterzing - Fortezza/Franzensfeste - Bressanone/Brixen - Chuisa/Klausen - Bolzano/Bozen - Ora/Auer - Trento/Trient - Rovereto/Rofreit - Ala/Ahl-am-Etsch - Verona - Isola della Scala - Nogara - Mirandola - Bologna
- Regional Train (Trenitalia Regional) Bolzano/Bozen-Ala/Ahl-am-Etsch: Bolzano/Bozen - Laives/Leifers - Ora/Aura - Egna/Neumarkt - Salorno/Salurn - Mezzocorona/Kronmetz - Trento/Trient - Rovereto/Rofreit - Mori - Ala/Ahl-am-Etsch

Cross-border

(A for Austria, D for Germany)

- Intercity train (ÖBB EuroCity) Munich-Verona/Venice: Munich (Hbf) (D) - Rosenheim (D) - Kufstein (A) - Jenbach (A) - Innsbruck (A) - Bolzano/Bozen - Trento/Trient - Rovereto/Rofreit - Verona - (Padua) - (Venice)
- Intercity train (ÖBB EuroCity) Munich-Verona/Bologna: Munich (Hbf) (D) - Rosenheim (D) - Kufstein (A) - Jenbach (A) - Innsbruck (A) - Bolzano/Bozen - Trento/Trient - Rovereto/Rofreit - Verona - (Bologna)

== Interchange ==
At Piazzale Orsi, close to railway station building, urban bus routes A, 4, 5, 6 and 7 stop here as well as suburban services to Trento, Riva del Garda and Ala.

== See also ==
- History of rail transport in Italy
- List of railway stations in Trentino-Alto Adige/Südtirol
- Rail transport in Italy
- Railway stations in Italy
