= Peschiera =

Peschiera may refer to:

- Peschiera, a genus of plants considered to be a synonym of Tabernaemontana
- Peschiera Borromeo, in the province of Milan, Italy
- Peschiera del Garda, in the province of Verona, Italy
  - Peschiera del Garda railway station
