= List of railway stations in Trentino-Alto Adige/Südtirol =

This is the list of the railway stations in Trentino-Alto Adige/Südtirol owned by Rete Ferroviaria Italiana, a branch of the Italian state company Ferrovie dello Stato.

== List ==
Station	Locality	Province	Category
Ala railway station	Ala	Trentino	Silver
Avio	Avio	Trentino	Bronze
Bolzano	Bolzano	South Tyrol	Gold
Bolzano South	Bolzano	South Tyrol	Silver
Borghetto all'Adige	Borghetto all'Adige	Trentino	Bronze
Borgo Valsugana Centro and Borgo Valsugana Est	Borgo Valsugana	Trentino	Silver
Brenner	Brenner	South Tyrol	Silver
Brixen	Brixen	South Tyrol	Silver
Bronzolo	Bronzolo	South Tyrol	Silver
Bruneck	Bruneck	South Tyrol	Silver
Calceranica	Calceranica	Trentino	Bronze
Caldonazzo	Caldonazzo	Trentino	Bronze
Freienfeld	Freienfeld	South Tyrol	Bronze
Casteldarne	Casteldarne	South Tyrol	Bronze
Klausen	Klausen	South Tyrol	Silver
Gossensaß	Gossensaß	South Tyrol	Bronze
Toblach	Toblach	South Tyrol	Silver
Neumarkt-Tramin	Neumarkt	South Tyrol	Silver
Franzensfeste	Franzensfeste	South Tyrol	Silver
Gargazon	Gargazon	South Tyrol	Bronze
Grigno	Grigno	Trentino	Bronze
Laives	Laives	South Tyrol	Silver
Lana-Burgstall	Lana	South Tyrol	Bronze
Lavis	Lavis	Trentino	Bronze
Levico Terme	Levico Terme	Trentino	Silver
Margreid-Kurtatsch	Margreid	South Tyrol	Bronze
Merano	Merano	South Tyrol	Silver
Merano-Maia Bassa	Merano	South Tyrol	Silver
Mezzocorona	Mezzocorona	Trentino	Silver
Welsberg-Gsies	Welsberg	South Tyrol	Silver
Mori	Mori	Trentino	Silver
Auer	Auer	South Tyrol	Silver
Pergine	Pergine	Trentino	Silver
Sigmundskron	Sigmundskron	South Tyrol	Bronze
Waidbruck	Waidbruck	South Tyrol	Silver
Povo-Mesiano	Povo	Trentino	Bronze
Mühlbach	Mühlbach	South Tyrol	Bronze
Roncegno Bagni-Marter	Roncegno Terme	Trentino	Bronze
Rovereto	Rovereto	Trentino	Gold
Innichen	Innichen	South Tyrol	Silver
San Cristoforo al Lago-Ischia	San Cristoforo al Lago	Trentino	Bronze
St Lorenzen	St Lorenzen	South Tyrol	Bronze
Salorno	Salorno	South Tyrol	Silver
Serravalle all'Adige	Serravalle all'Adige	Trentino	Bronze
Siebeneich	Siebeneich	South Tyrol	Bronze
Strigno	Strigno	Trentino	Bronze
Terlan-Andrian	Terlan	South Tyrol	Bronze
Tezze di Grigno	Tezze	Trentino	Bronze
Trento	Trento	Trentino	Gold
Trento San Bartolameo	Trento	Trentino	Bronze
Trento Santa Chiara	Trento	Trentino	Bronze
Olang-Antholz	Olang	South Tyrol	Bronze
Vintl	Vintl	South Tyrol	Bronze
Niederdorf	Niederdorf	South Tyrol	Bronze
Villazzano	Trento	Trentino	Silver
Vilpian-Nals	Vilpian	South Tyrol	Bronze
Sterzing	Sterzing	South Tyrol	Silver

== See also ==
- Railway stations in Italy
- Ferrovie dello Stato
- Rail transport in Italy
- High-speed rail in Italy
- Transport in Italy
