= Vicenza railway station =

Train station in Italy

Vicenza
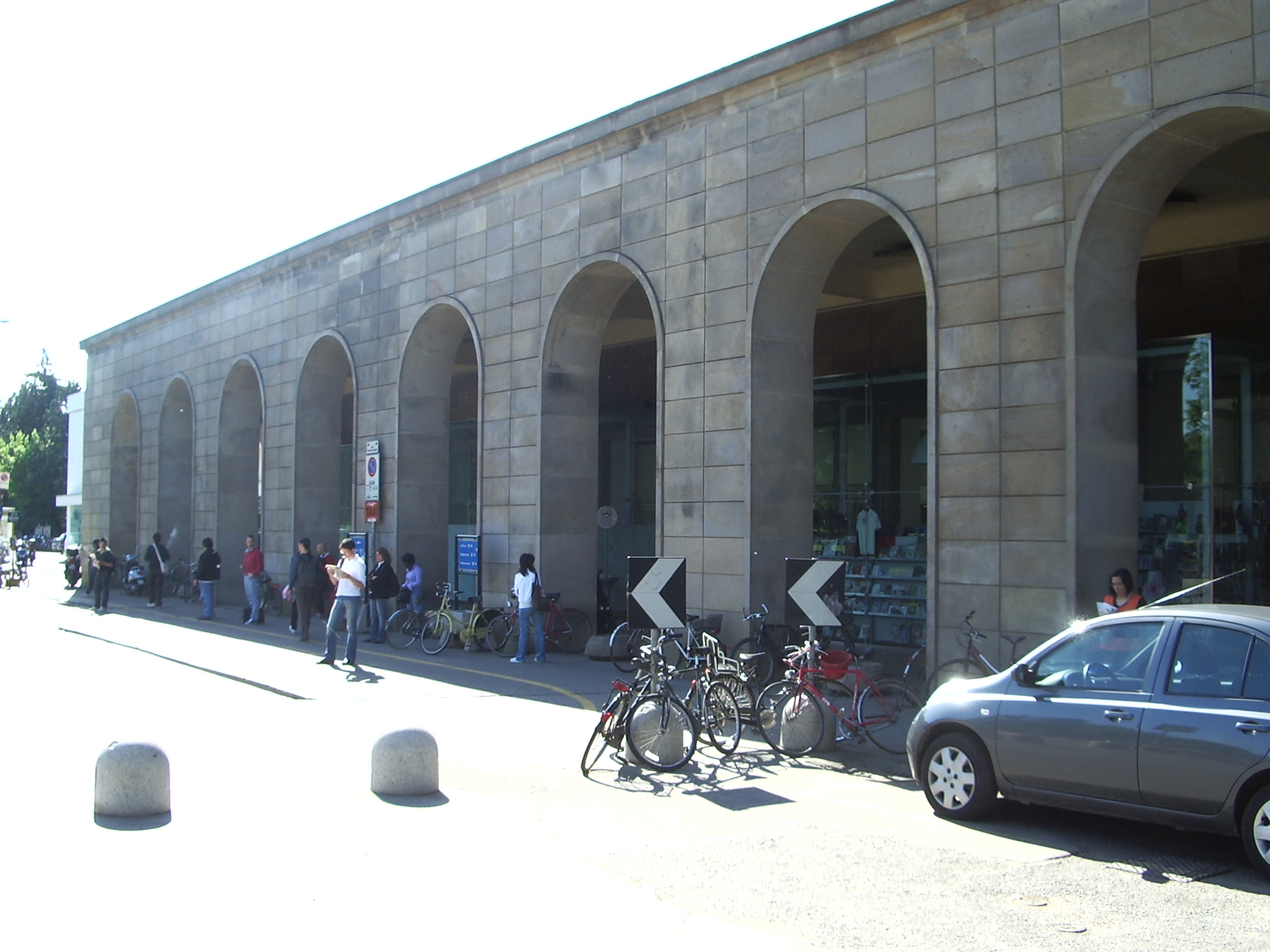
- The passenger building.

General information
- Location: Piazzale della Stazione; 36100 Vicenza; Vicenza, Vicenza, Veneto; Italy
- Coordinates: 45°32′29″N 11°32′27″E
- Owner: Rete Ferroviaria Italiana
- Operator: Centostazioni
- Lines: Milan–Venice; Vicenza–Schio; Vicenza–Treviso
- Platforms: 8
- Train operators: Trenitalia
- Connections: Urban (AIM) Suburban (FTV) buses

History
- Opened: 13 January 1846; 180 years ago

Services
Preceding station	Trenitalia	Following station
Verona Porta Nuova towards Milano Centrale	Frecciarossa	Padova towards Udine
Verona Porta Nuova towards Milano Centrale	Frecciarossa	Padova towards Venezia Santa Lucia or Trieste Centrale
Verona Porta Nuova towards Genève-Cornavin	EuroCity	Padova towards Milano Centrale or Venezia Santa Lucia
Verona Porta Nuova towards Zürich HB	EuroCity	Padova towards Venezia Santa Lucia
Terminus	Regionale	Anconetta towards Schio
Terminus	Regionale	San Pietro in Gu towards Treviso Centrale
Preceding station	ÖBB	Following station
Verona Porta Nuova towards La Spezia Centrale	Nightjet	Padova towards München Hbf
Verona Porta Nuova towards Roma Termini	Nightjet	Padova towards Wien Hbf
Location
- Location within Northern Italy

Vicenza railway station (Italian: Stazione di Vicenza) (IATA: VNZ) serves the town and comune of Vicenza, in the Veneto region, northeastern Italy. Opened in 1846, it forms part of the Milan–Venice railway, and is also a junction of two branch lines, to Schio and Treviso, respectively.

The station is currently owned by Rete Ferroviaria Italiana (RFI). The commercial area of the passenger building is managed by Centostazioni. Train services to and from the station are operated by Trenitalia. Each of these companies is a subsidiary of Ferrovie dello Stato Italiane (FS), Italy's state-owned rail company.

== Features ==
The station has a large passenger building that houses many facilities for passengers, the headquarters of the Railway Police, and the offices of Trenitalia and the station management.

The six through platforms at the station are numbered from 1 to 6. At the far eastern end of the station, there are also two bay platforms (1 Giardino and 2 Giardino), at which trains arrive from and depart to Schio and Treviso. In total, there are eight platform tracks for passengers, plus some tracks for the exclusive use of goods handling, manoeuvering, stabling and storage.

The station is equipped with a locomotive depot, and a short distance away there are major repair shops.

== Services ==
As of the December 2023 timetable change, the following services stop at Vicenza:

- Frecciarossa: services to Genova Brignole, Milano Centrale, Torino Porta Nuova, Trieste Centrale, Venezia Santa Lucia, and Udine.
- NightJet: service to La Spezia Centrale, Roma Termini, München, and Wien.
- EuroCity: services to Bologna Centrale, Genève-Cornavin, München, Venezia Santa Lucia, and Zürich.
- Regionale Veloce: service between Verona Porta Nuova and Venezia Santa Lucia.
- Regionale: service to Brescia, Schio, Treviso Centrale, and Venezia Santa Lucia.

== Renovations ==
Work on upgrading and enhancement of the entire structure of the station building is currently being completed. The work is financed by an investment of approximately 2.4 million euros by Centostazioni and RFI. To achieve a uniform appearance and enhance the main facades, the front and sides of the building have received a veneer of brick and Vicenza yellow stone.

In addition to the retrofitting of existing facilities, and removal of architectural barriers (with the laying of a new path for the vision-impaired), the station has been equipped with new shopping facilities. The previously existing businesses (bar/pizzeria, a tobacconist, newsagent and bank with door ATM) have been joined by a bookshop (Libreria Mondadori), a perfume shop/convenience store (Schlecker), a phone shop (Smartphone), a costume jewellery shop (4You), a clothing store (Fila), another shop (Zippo), an insurance office and a car rental agency (Major).

== Passenger and train movements ==
The station has about 7.7 million passenger movements each year.

== Gallery ==
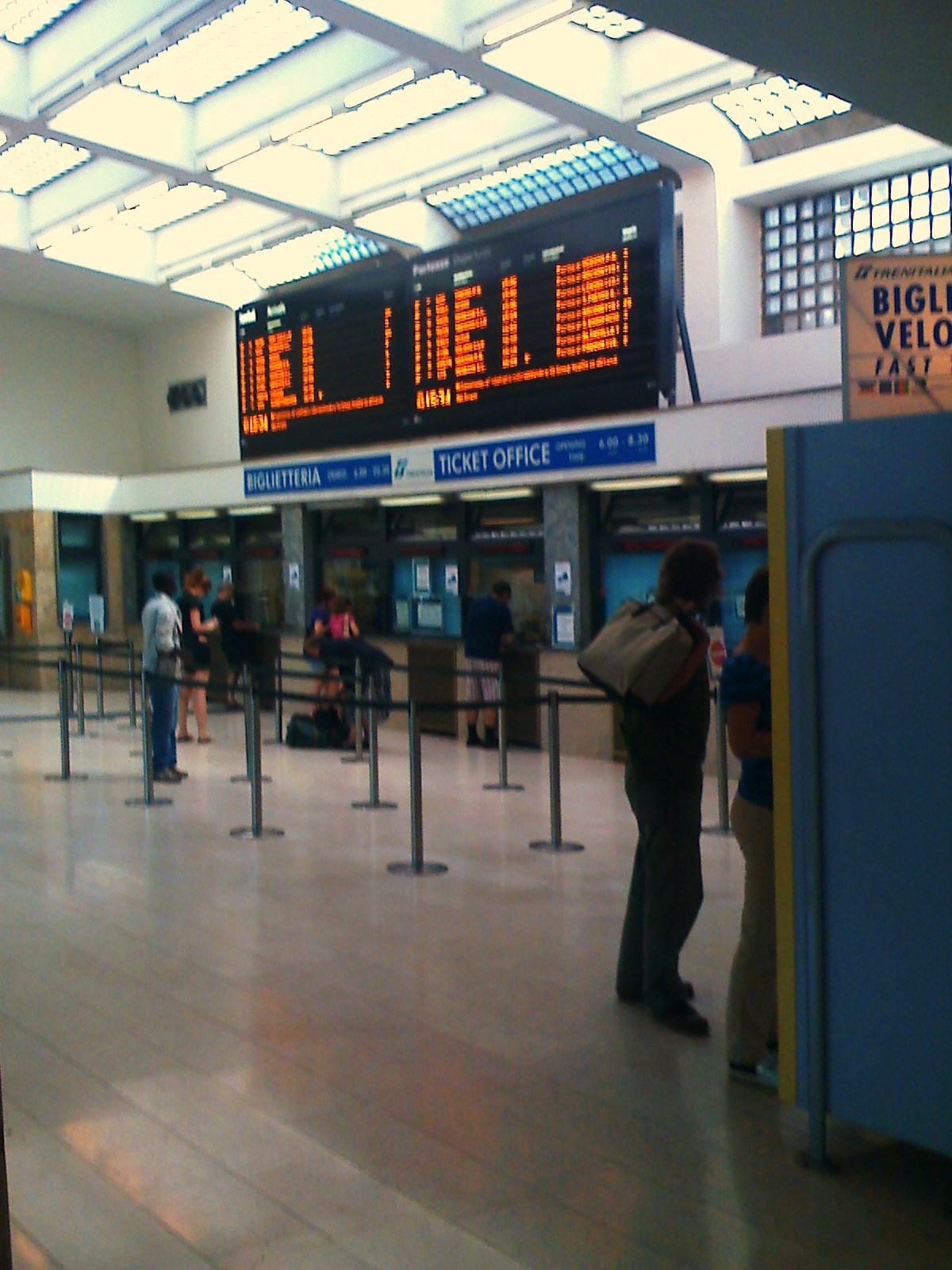
Ticketing hall

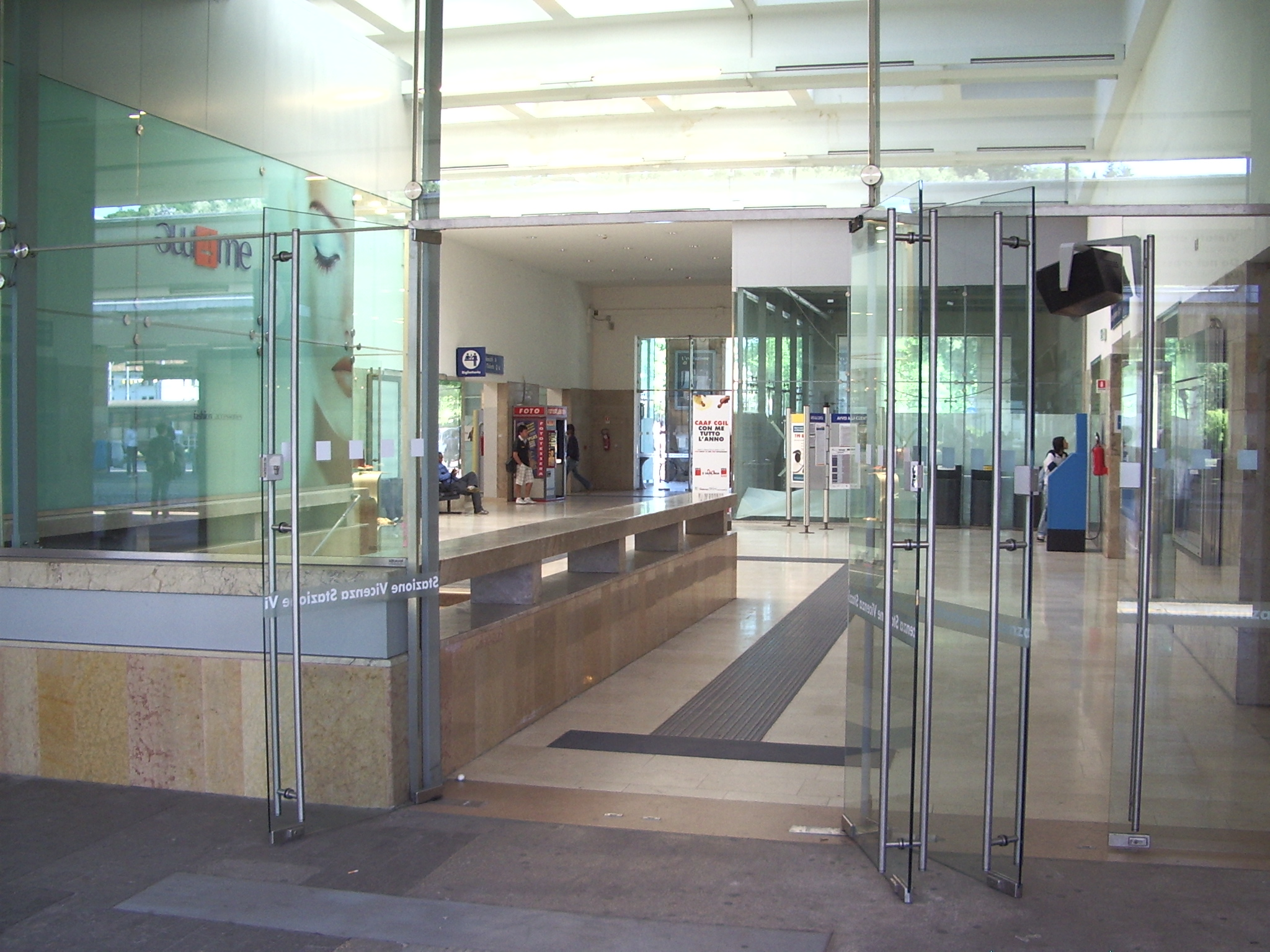
Hall leading to platform 1 to Venice

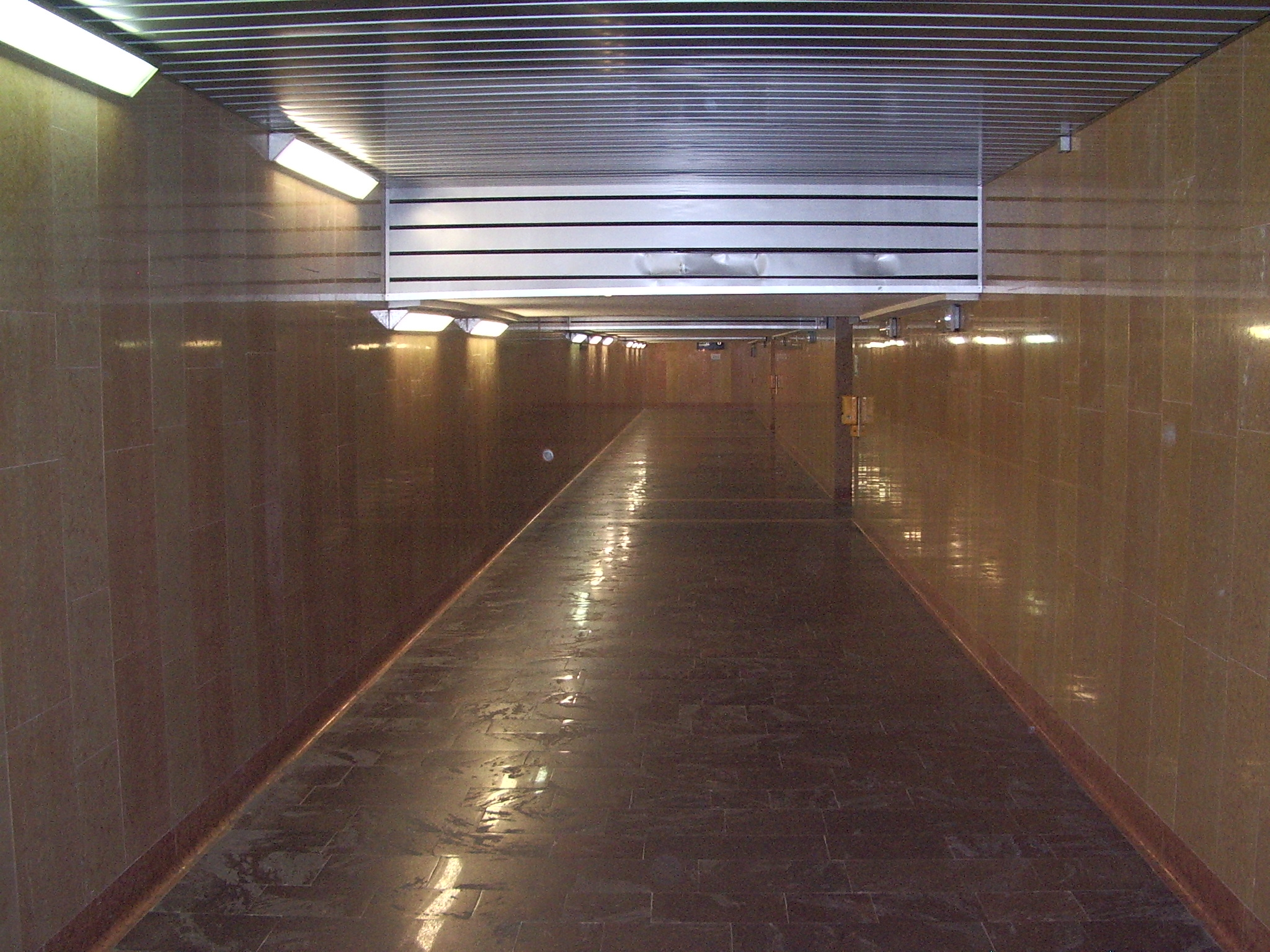
Underpass to platforms 2 to 6 for Milan

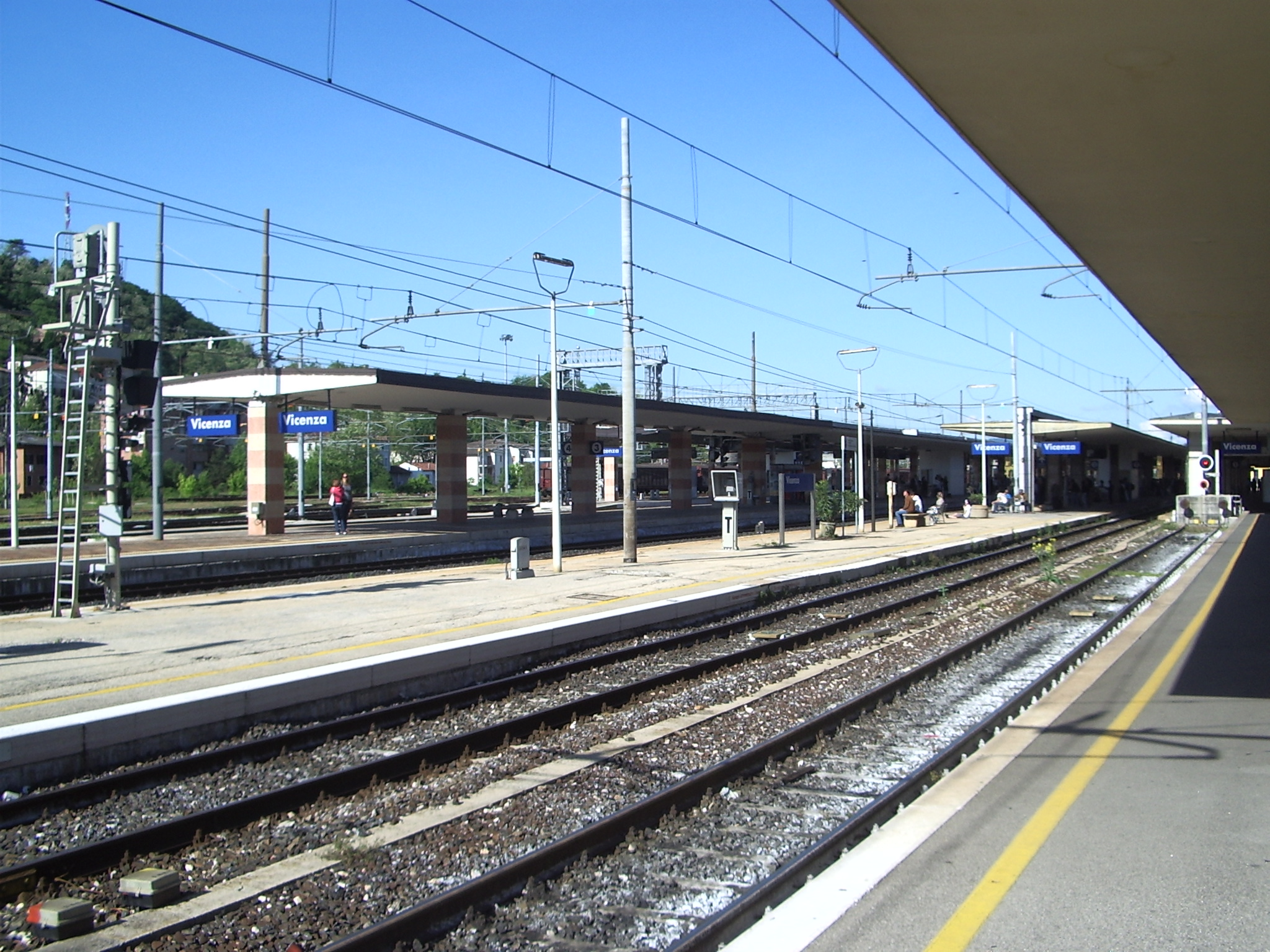
Platforms 1 and 1 Giardino
