= Verona Porta Nuova railway station =

Railway station in Verona, Italy

Verona Porta Nuova
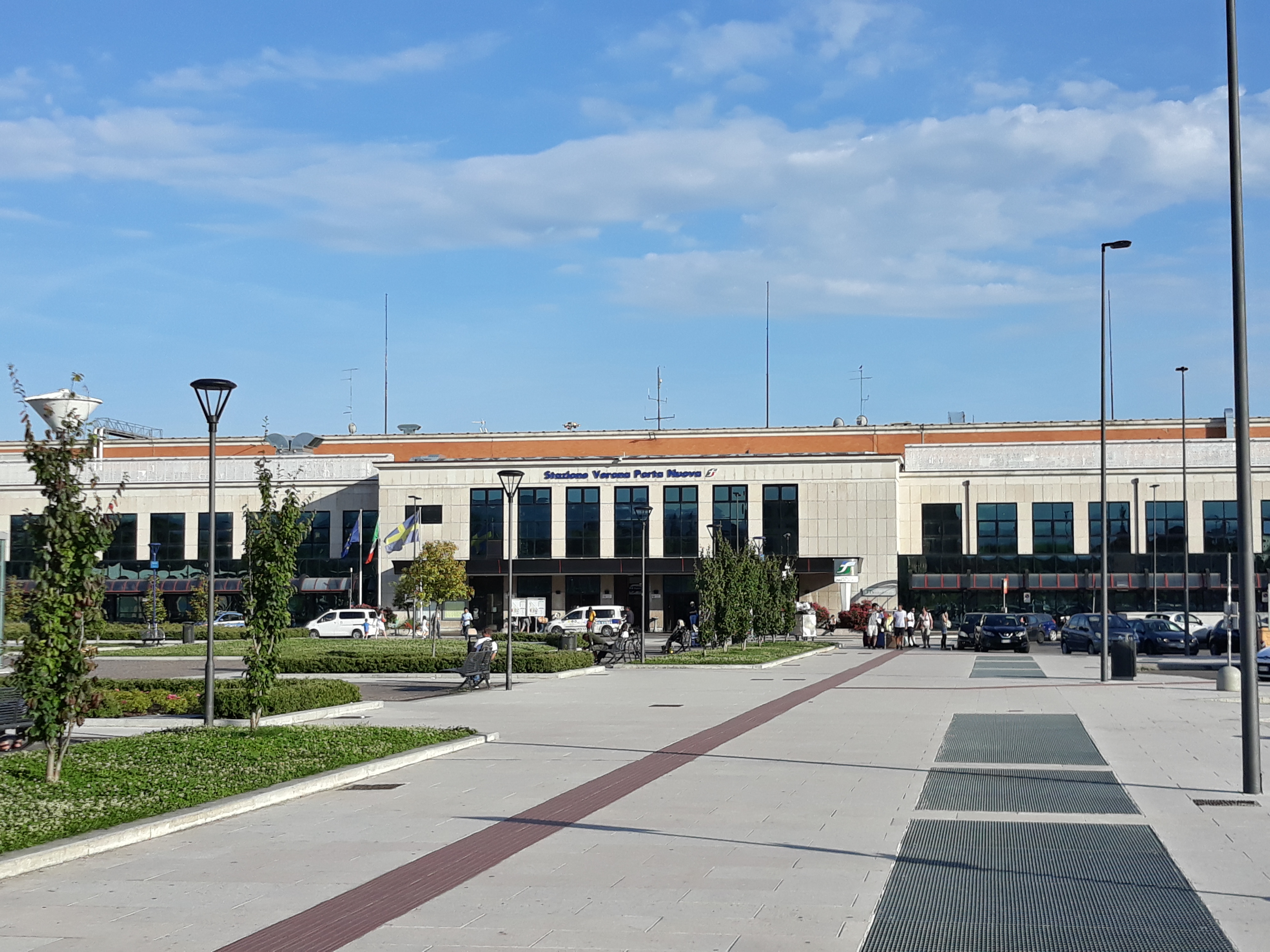
- The station and bus terminus (before 2015)

General information
- Location: Piazzale 25 Aprile, 6; 37138 Verona; Verona (VR), Veneto; Italy
- Coordinates: 45°25′45″N 10°58′56″E
- Owner: Rete Ferroviaria Italiana
- Operator: Grandi Stazioni
- Lines: Milan–Venice; Verona–Bologna; Verona–Innsbruck; Verona–Mantua–Modena; Verona–Legnago–Rovigo
- Train operators: Trenitalia; Trenord; NTV-Italo; ÖBB-DB
- Connections: Urban, interurban and airport buses

Other information
- IATA code: XIX

History
- Opened: 1851

Services
Preceding station	Trenitalia	Following station
Desenzano del Garda-Sirmione towards Milano Centrale	Frecciarossa	Vicenza towards Udine
Desenzano del Garda-Sirmione towards Milano Centrale	Frecciarossa	Vicenza towards Venezia Santa Lucia or Trieste Centrale
Rovereto towards Bolzano/Bozen	Frecciarossa	Bologna Centrale towards Sibari
Peschiera del Garda towards Genève-Cornavin	EuroCity	Vicenza towards Milano Centrale or Venezia Santa Lucia
Peschiera del Garda towards Zürich HB	EuroCity	Vicenza towards Venezia Santa Lucia
Domegliara-Sant'Ambrogio towards Brenner	Regionale Veloce	Isola della Scala towards Bologna Centrale
Domegliara-Sant'Ambrogio towards Bolzano/Bozen	Regionale	Terminus
Terminus	Regionale	Dossobuono towards Mantova
Terminus	Regionale	Buttapietra towards Bologna Centrale
Preceding station	DB Fernverkehr	Following station
Rovereto towards München Hbf	EC 89	Bologna Centrale Terminus
Preceding station	ÖBB	Following station
Peschiera del Garda towards La Spezia Centrale	Nightjet	Vicenza towards München Hbf
Peschiera del Garda towards Roma Termini	Nightjet	Vicenza towards Wien Hbf
Preceding station	Trenord	Following station
Peschiera del Garda towards Milano Centrale	RE6	Terminus
Location
- Location within Veneto Location within Northern Italy Location within Italy

Verona Porta Nuova is the main railway station of Verona, Italy. It is one of the two stations serving central Verona; the other station, Verona Porta Vescovo, is located at the east of the city.

It is situated at Piazzale XXV Aprile ("25 April") at the south of the city centre. The station is a 20-minute walk (approximately 1.5 kilometres (0.9 mi)) or 10-minute bus ride from Arena di Verona. The station was opened in 1852 by the Austrian Empire's Südbahn and, after its transfer to Italy, has substantially been rebuilt between 1910 and 1922. Following the destruction by allied bombings during the Second World War, the present building was reconstructed between 1946 and 1949.

Verona Porta Nuova is a major cross-junction station in Italy: the north–south Brenner Railway connecting Austria and Bologna meets the east–west Milan-Venice railway. The north–south route has been classified by the European Union as Trans-European Network (TEN) Berlin-Palermo Railway Axis.

The station handles 25 million passengers annually.

== History ==
=== Bern-im-Wälsch under Austria ===
The first train to arrive at Verona Porta Nuova was driven by the locomotive Verona on the newly built railway from Venice which crossed River Adige (River Etsch).

The initial station building was a temporary wooden structure; it was replaced in 1852 by a small masonry building. The masonry, however, had an odd shape: a part of its front had eight arched openings, which went further forward than the other part with only three.

Upon its opening, Verona Porta Nuova was less important than Porta Vescovo, which was located near a major Austrian military camp. At that time, Verona, called Bern-im-Wälsch, was one of the Austrian Empire's main military strongholds with a capacity of 120,000 troops. The Porta Nuova station was initially used only by two of the three classes of passenger trains then in the region: "omnibus" and "mixed" trains. It did not handle the fastest, most expensive "direct" trains or offer any baggage service.

==== Network Extension ====
In 1853, a single-track line became operational from Verona to Porto Mantovano (Mantua). In the same year, the Austrian Empire began construction of the Brenner Railway over the Brenner Pass at 1,371 m (4,498 ft), connecting County of Tyrol and Kingdom of Lombardy–Venetia. The Brenner Railway was among Austria's first trans-alpine heavy railways along with the now defunct Franzensfeste-Marburg Railway (Fortezza in Italy and Maribor in Slovenia).

In 1854, the Venice-Verona Railway began westward extension towards Brescia and Bergamo.

In 1859, the Brenner Railway from Verona reached Bozen.

In 1867, the entire Brenner Railway was completed and connected Verona to Innsbruck over the Brenner Pass.

=== Network transfer to Italy ===
After Austria's defeat in the Austro-Prussian War (1866), in which Italy sided with Prussia over territorial promise of Venetia, ownership of the Brenner Railway south of Ahl-am-Etsch was transferred to Italy.

In 1873, Verona-Modena railway crossed River Mincio and reached Mantua. Extension to Modena was completed in 1874, connecting this railway to Milan-Bologna mainline.

In 1877, a railway line between Verona and Rovigo opened.

With the absorption of Veneto into Italy in 1866, the Milan-Verona-Venice Railway came under the management of Upper Italian Railways. The size of Porta Vescovo was no longer sufficient in handling rail traffic; Porta Nuova was therefore designated as the main station of Verona. In 1900, the building was temporarily enlarged with a central wooden building, while projects were being developing for the new station. Architects initially envisaged the station comprising six platforms with additional tracks for the storage of rolling stock and for freight train operations.

==== First Reconstruction (1910s) ====
Work on reconstructing the new station building, designed by the architect Dini, began in 1910 and was almost complete in 1913, albeit in a preliminary form. The proposed building would be 114 m (374 ft) long and 20 m (66 ft) high, contain a central dome and two smaller buildings on its side, and hoist a canopy along its facade. The central section would host the ticket office and luggage facility; there would be a waiting room on the left was and a buffet the right. Offices would occupy the second floor. These plans, however, were not well-received among the Veronese.

By early 1915, the new freight facilities were already in operation, including the commissioning of a large goods yard and locomotive depot. The outbreak of the First World War halted reconstruction work of the station. The formal re-opening, therefore, was delayed until 22 March 1922. The re-opened station's interior was decorated with mosaics by the master mosaic artist, Amedeo Mantellato, of Venice. In the 1920s, a track connection was built between the Brenner line and the goods yard.

In 1924, a more direct line to Bologna, Verona-Bologna railway, was inaugurated. The route diverts to the east from the Verona-Mantua line and bypasses Mantua and Modena.

In the 1930s, a new depot for locomotives was added to the storage facilities. Electrification of the lines around Verona was completed in 1941.

==== Second Reconstruction (post-1945) ====
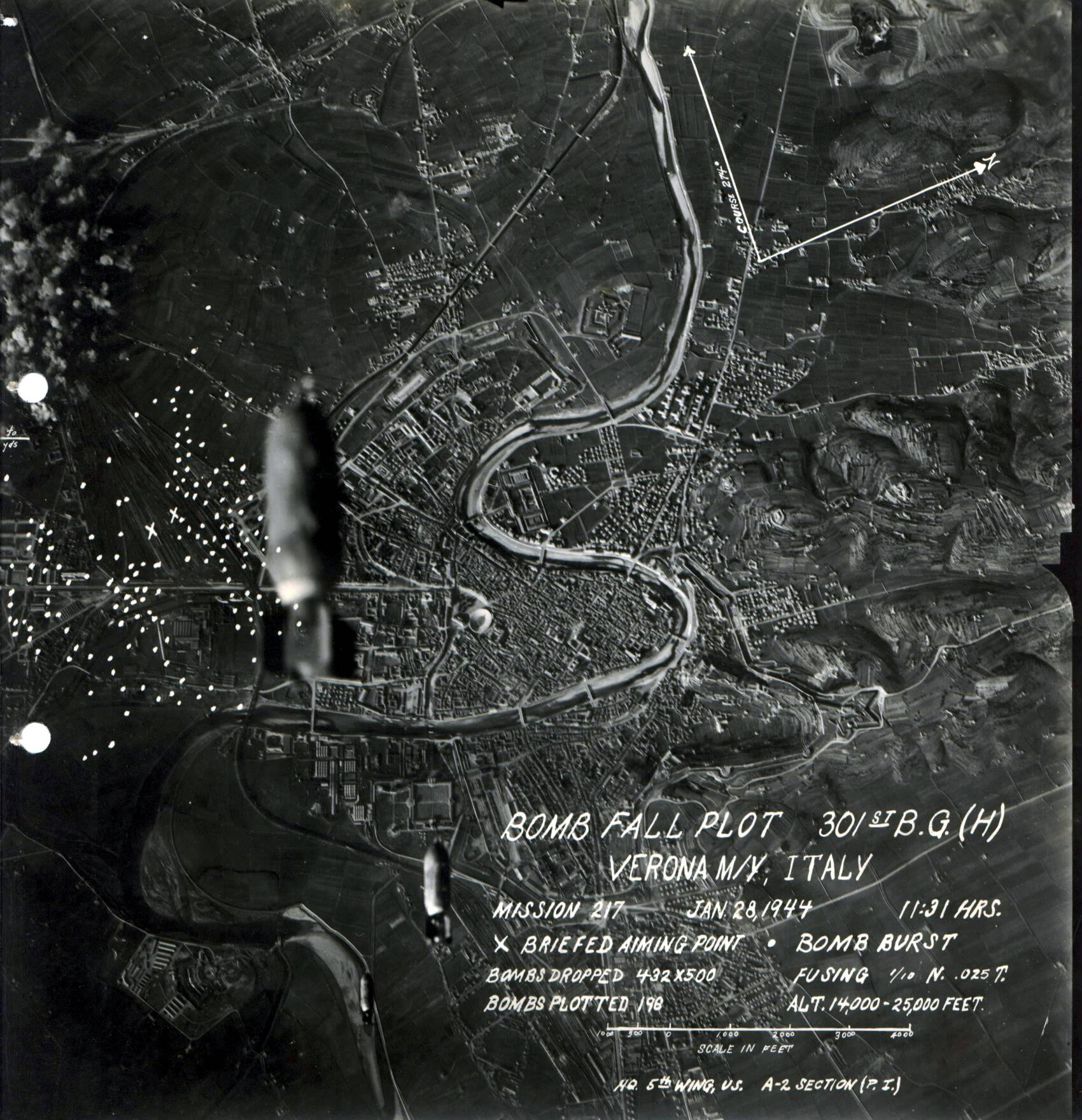
Bomb fall plot of bombing on Verona on 28/01/1944, the target was Verona Porta Nuova marked by two X on the left side of the frame

The station was partially destroyed by bombing during World War II. The first isolated bombing raid of the station was carried out by a formation of four aircraft on 21 October 1940; the raid made use of cluster bombs and incendiaries. In total, the city has suffered twenty bombing raids. Two of the toughest attacks took place on 4 and 28 January 1945 and the station was rendered unusable.

In September 1946, the station was rebuilt on the same site to a design by the architect Roberto Narducci. This rebuilt station, aesthetically very different from the original, though structurally similar, was completed in March 1949. Many types of marble from Verona were used, covering an area of 4,000 m^{2} (43,000 ft^{2}); the floors were laid out with mosaics composed of ceramic tiles and the furniture was installed that was designed to harmonise with the building.

The new station carried over from the previous station a gap between its elevated platforms and the level of the pedestrian areas outside the station. This peculiarity has forced services to be organised on two floors: on the ground floor there are services for business travellers and the public, while rail-related services are located on the upper floor. The platforms have metal roofs in Art Nouveau style (even with those that survived from the previous station); whereas the roofs of the central and two lateral buildings are made of reinforced concrete. The current station building, however, does not include any elements of historical and architectural heritage.

==== Renovation (2014-15) ====
The station was included in the program of rehabilitation among major Italian stations, carried out by Grandi Stazioni, a subsidiary of the Italian State Railway. It was renovated in order to accommodate the Milan–Verona high-speed railway and the Verona–Venice high-speed railway.

The station area, managed by Grandi Stazioni, extends over an area of 127,500 m^{2} (31.5 acres) with buildings occupying 22,840 m^{2} (245,800 ft^{2}). Among these, 2,730 m^{2} (29,400 ft^{2}) was involved in the first phase of the renovation. In April 2014, the information boards (train departures and arrivals) at the station's main ticket hall were upgraded from analog to digital display.

The bus station area was reorganised for the winter bus timetable from 14 September 2015 onwards: the western area became an outdoor garden at ground level, a short-stay car park and underground parking spaces. The urban (city) and extraurban (suburban and intercity) bus stops were extended westwards and rearranged to bring some routes closer to the main area. A new waiting hall, which hosts the ticket office, was built at the bus station.

== Passenger statistics ==
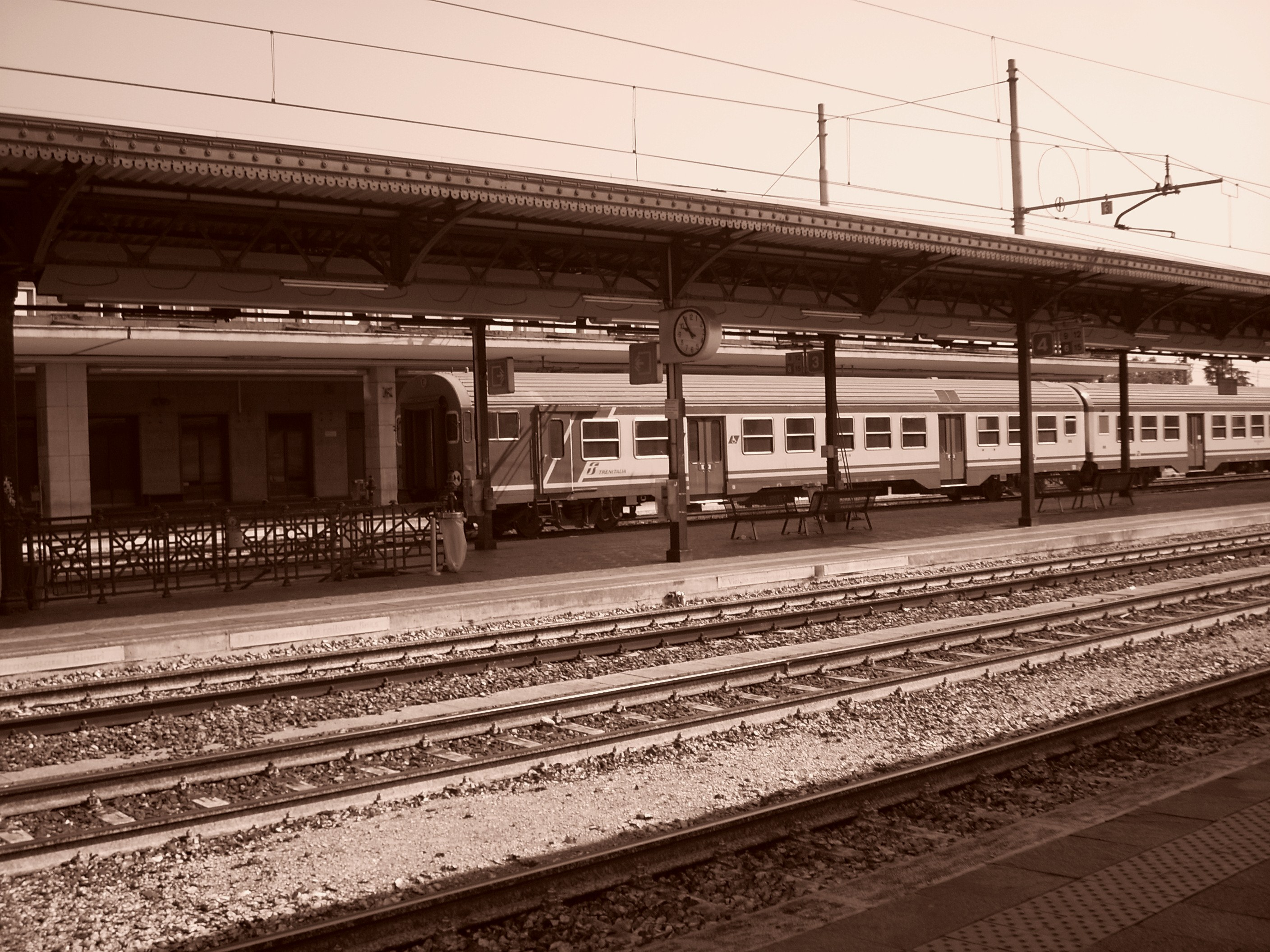
Platforms

Verona Porta Nuova is used by about 68,000 passengers each day and a total of 25 million annually. It is the ninth busiest railway station in Italy. The station area is the centre of Verona's transport network: the Bus Terminal is located directly in front of station building and hosts services by ATV Verona (“Azienda Trasporti Verona”, ATV) to Verona-Villafranca Airport and popular tourist attractions along Lake Garda.

== Station ==
The station building of Verona Porta Nuova has 4 storeys:

- the basement is occupied by Ferrovie dello Stato offices;
- the ground floor consists of Trenitalia's large ticket hall and travel information room, ÖBB (Austrian State Railways) ticket office, Italo NTV customer service booth, a bookstore, several commercial stores, a newsagent, left luggage facility, bars and washroom facilities;
- the platform level is used for passenger services and a police station at the end of Platform 1;
- the first and second floor are occupied by rail offices.

== Services ==
As of the December 2023 timetable change, the following services stop at Verona Porta Nuova:

- Frecciarossa: services to Bolzano/Bozen, Genova Brignole, Milano Centrale, Sibari, Torino Porta Nuova, Trieste Centrale, Venezia Santa Lucia, and Udine.
- Italo: various high-speed services.
- NightJet: service to La Spezia Centrale, Roma Termini, München, and Wien.
- EuroCity: services to Bologna Centrale, Genève-Cornavin, München, Venezia Santa Lucia, and Zürich.
- Regionale Veloce: services to Bologna Centrale, Brenner, and Venezia Santa Lucia.
- RegioExpress: service to Milano Centrale.
- Regionale: service to Bologna Centrale, Bolzano/Bozen, Brescia, Mantova, and Venezia Santa Lucia.

== See also ==
- History of rail transport in Italy
- List of railway stations in Veneto
- Rail transport in Italy
- Railway stations in Italy
