= Trento–Malè–Mezzana railway =

Narrow gauge electric railway in Northern italy

Ferrovia Trento-Malé-Mezzana (FTM)
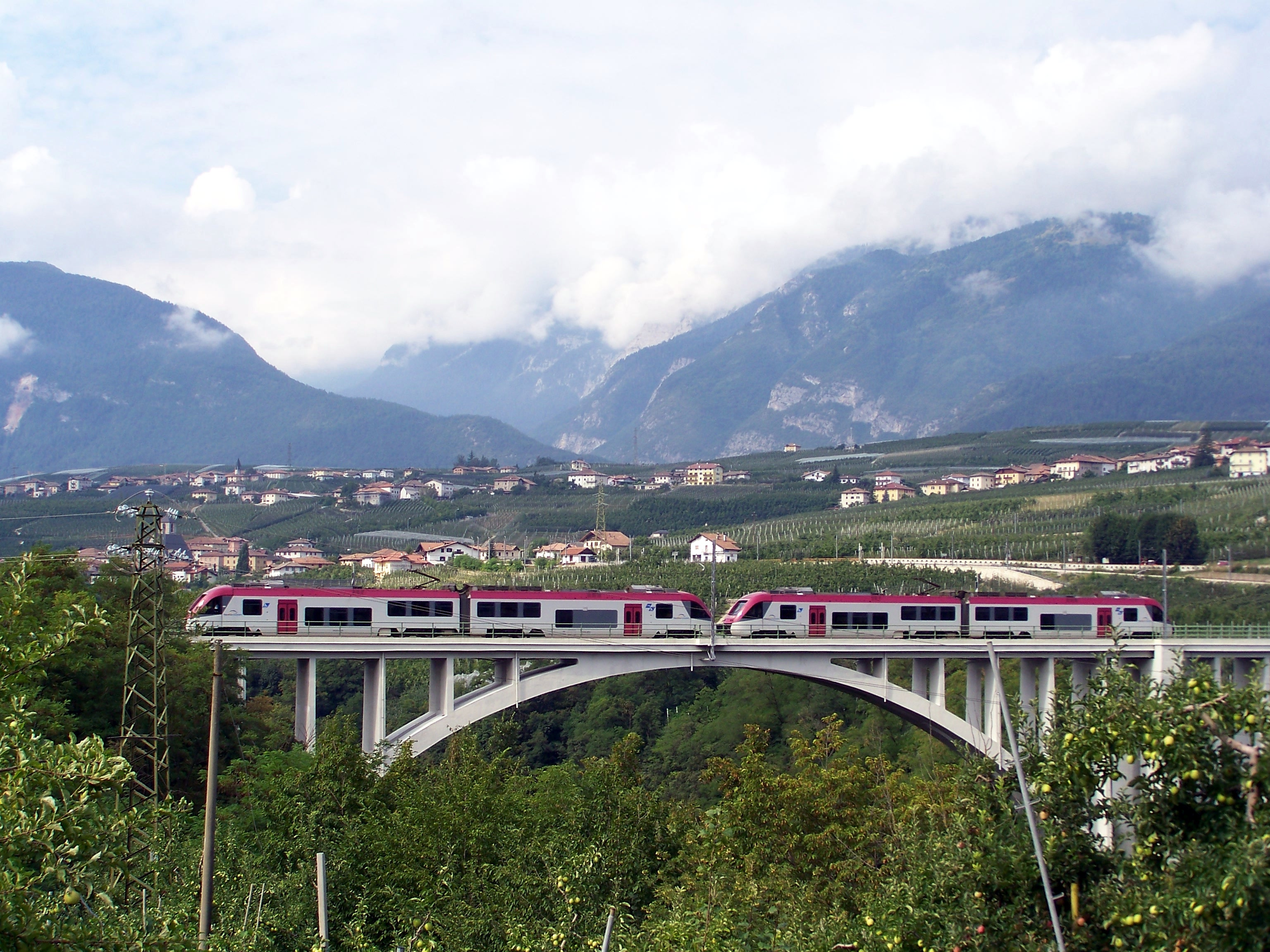
- A Coradia Meridian ETi 8/8 403 on Santa Giustina railway bridge

Overview
- Headquarters: Trento
- Dates of operation: 1909–present

Technical
- Track gauge: 1,000 mm (3 ft 3 3/8 in) metre gauge
- Electrification: 3,000 V DC (converted from 800 V DC in 1964)
- Length: 66 kilometres (41 mi)

The Trento–Malé–Mezzana railway (Italian: Ferrovia Trento-Malé-Mezzana (FTM)) is a metre gauge electric railway originally connecting Trento and Malé in Trentino, northern Italy. In 2002 it was extended to the Marilleva ski resort in the Italian Alps and in 2016 to Mezzana. The line has now a total length of 66 kilometres (41 mi). FTM transports 2 million passengers per year along its 56 km (35 mi) line, including tourists.

== History ==
In 1891 a proposal for a new railway in Trentino (then part of Austria-Hungary) was issued by Paolo Oss Mazzurana, mayor of Trento. Construction began in 1907 and the railway was inaugurated in 1909 as a 1,000 mm (3 ft 3 3/8 in) narrow-gauge tramway, electrified at 800 V DC (converted to 3,000 V DC in 1964).

After the end of World War I, the Trentino was given to Italy, the railway was acquired by the Ferrovie dello Stato, and then established as an independent company in 1936. The line was almost totally rebuilt, shortened by 4 kilometres (2.5 mi) but assuming the character of a true railway without road-embedded sections. In 1945 it passed under a new public company, Società Locale Trento Malè, who controlled it until 2002, when it became part of Trentino trasporti.

== Gallery ==
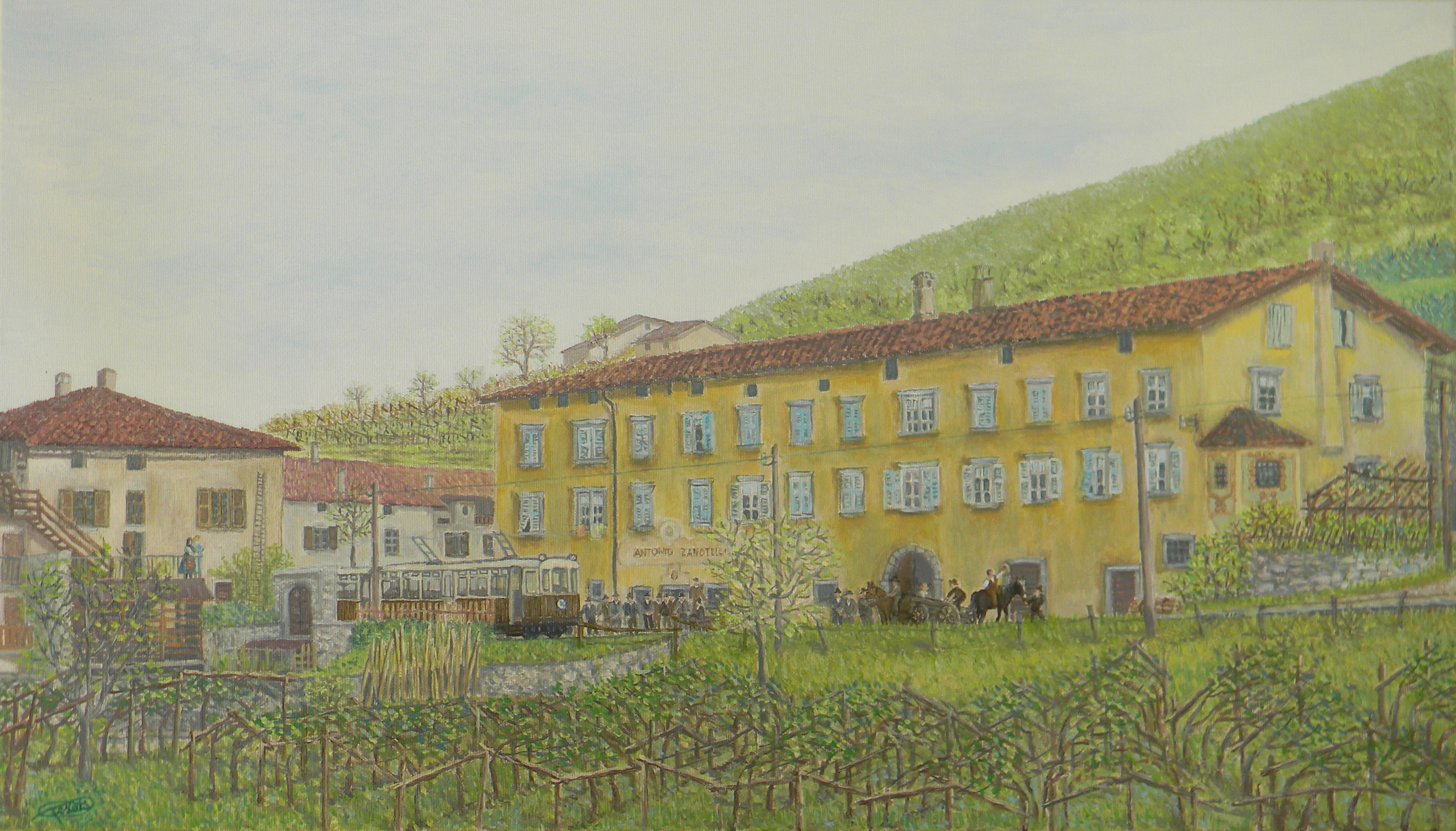
Inauguration of the electric railway in Nave San Felice, Lavis (TN), 1909. Portrait by Renato Restelli.

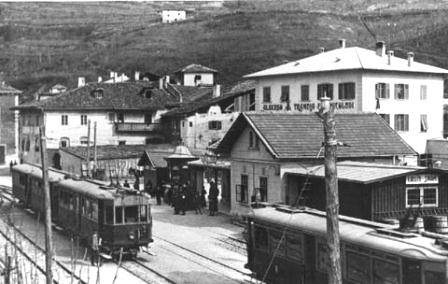
Lavis tramway station in 1915

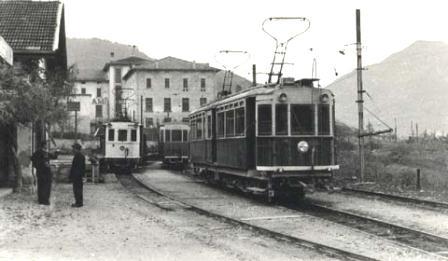
Cles tramway station in 1955

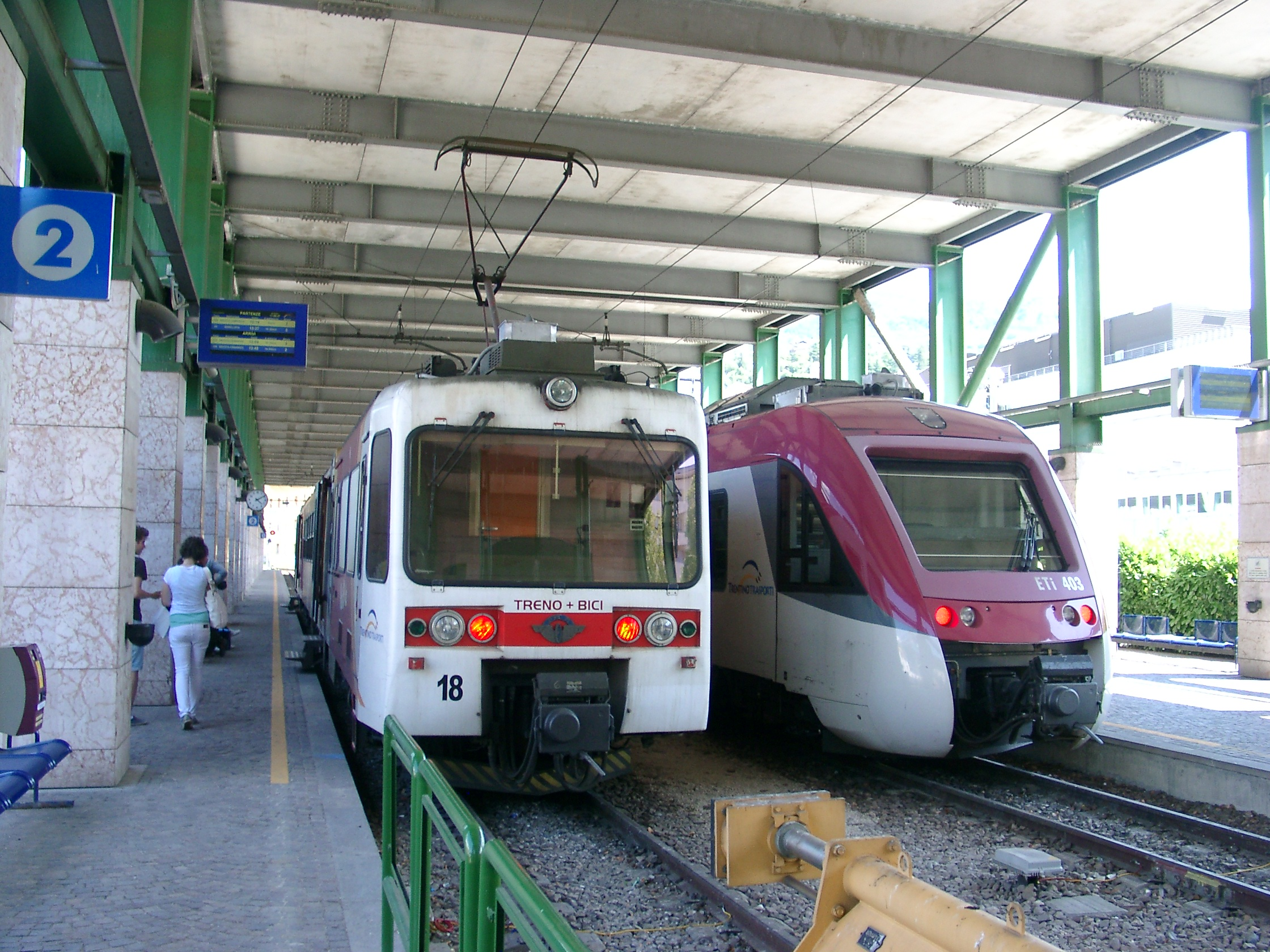
An old FiReMa E86 and a new ETi 404 at Trento railway station

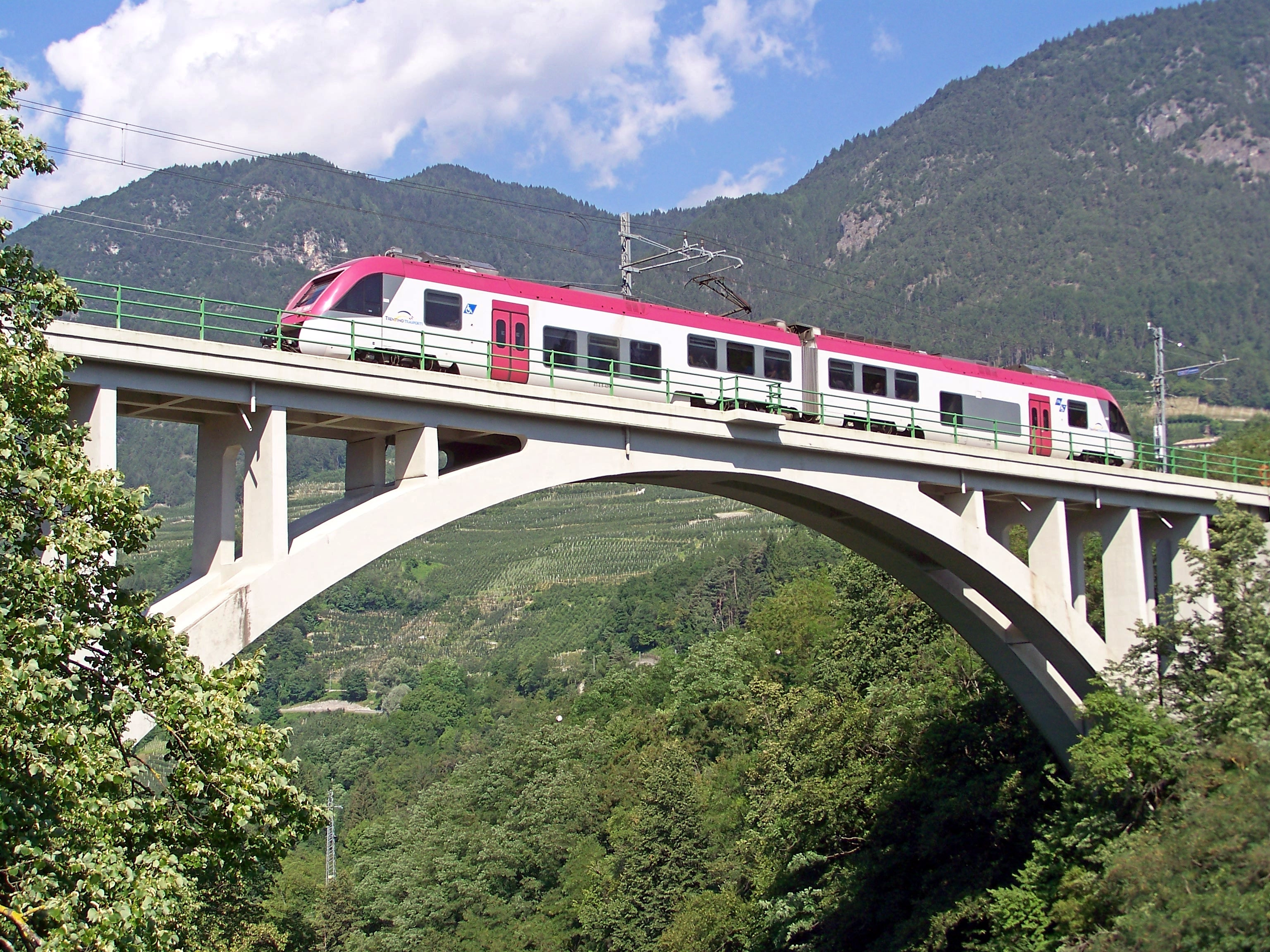
A train on Mostizzolo railway bridge

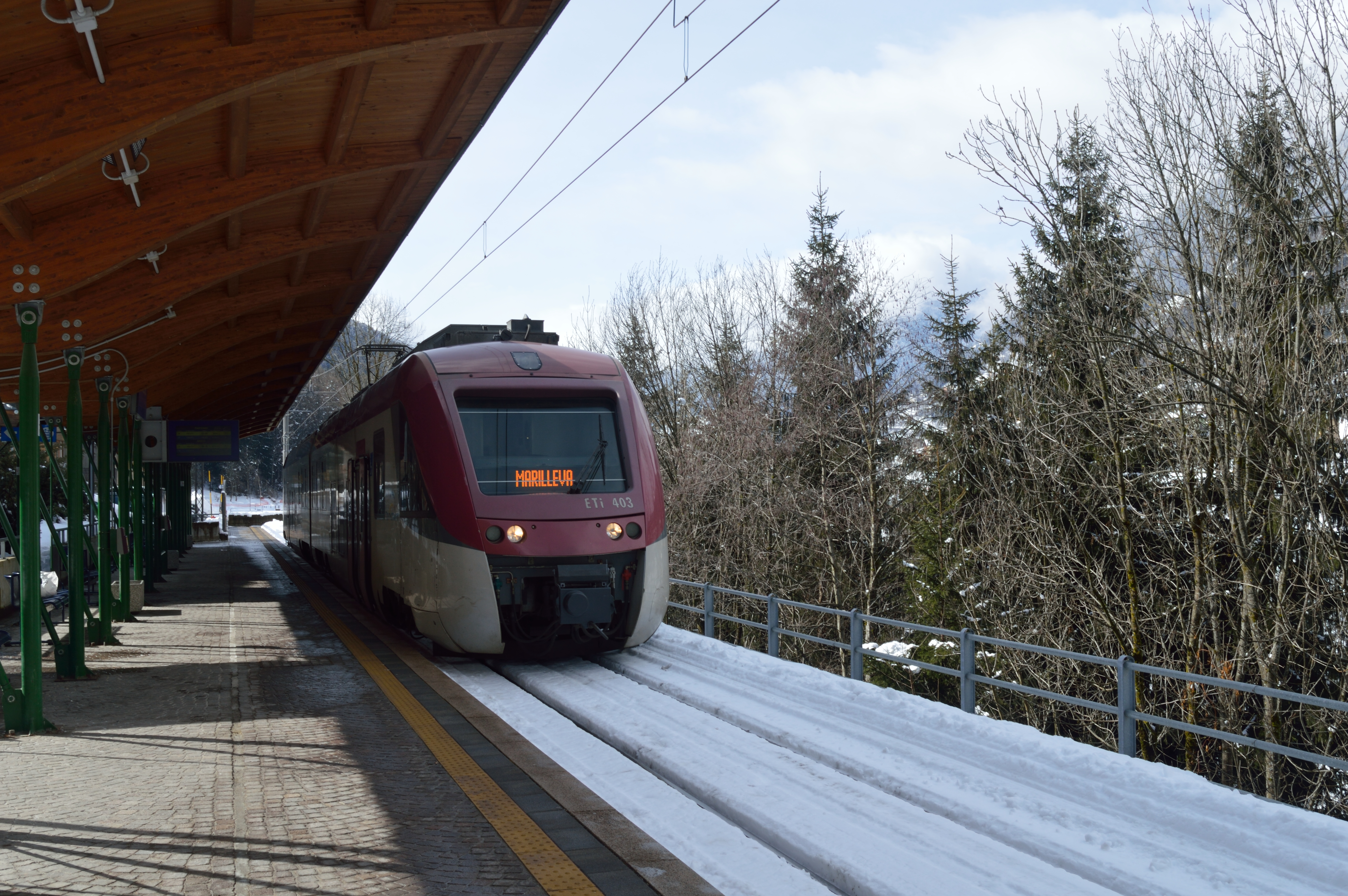
A train entering Marilleva railway station
