= Porta Vescovo, Verona =

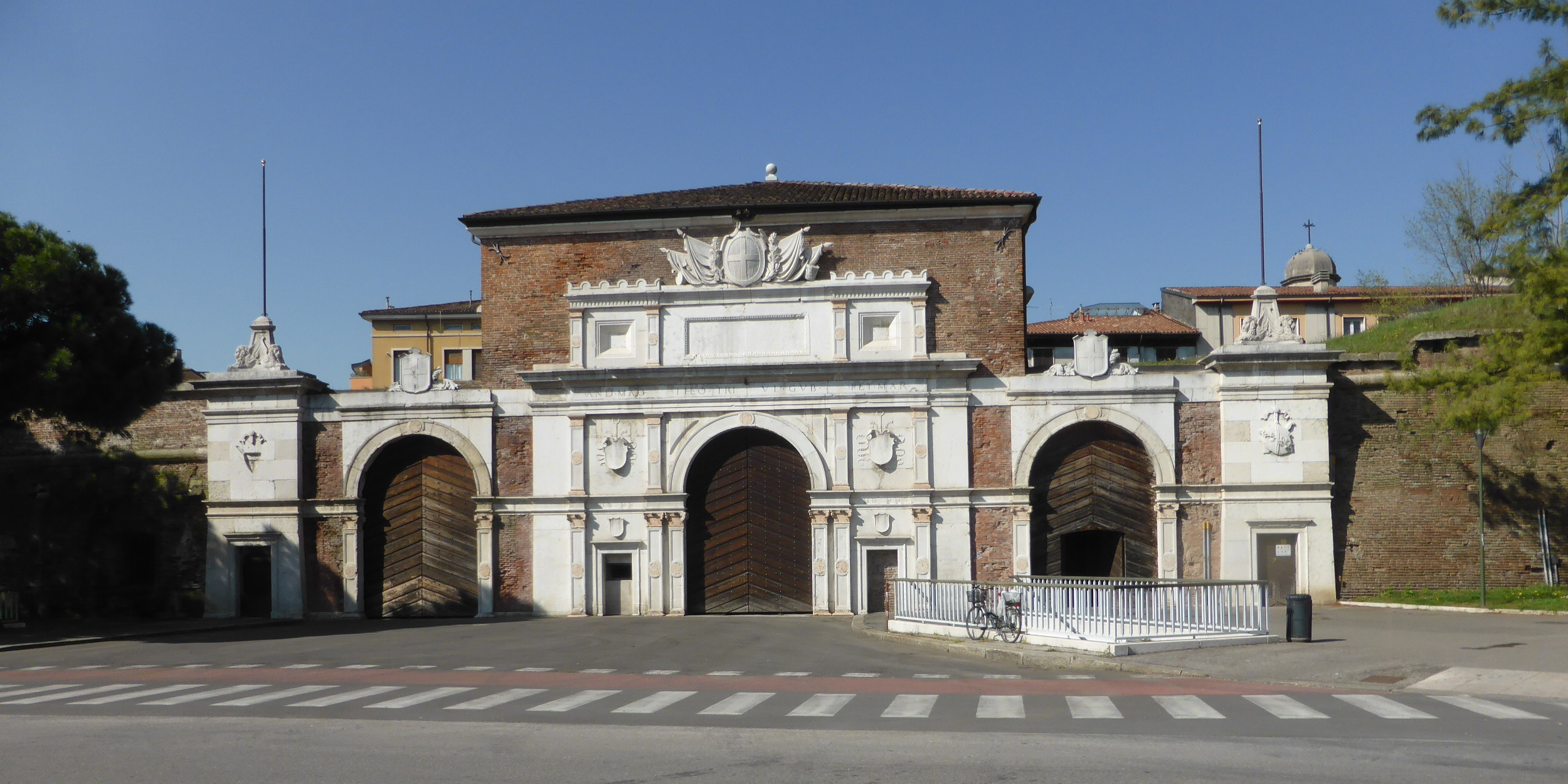
Porta Vescovo, Verona

Porta Vescovo was a gate or portal of the former outer medieval walls of the city of Verona, Italy. It was designed and built during 1520 by the architect Teodoro Trivulzio. It is named Vescovo, because the gate once collected a toll benefitting the bishop.

The external façade of the central arch is decorated with marble with a form resembling an ancient Roman triumphal arch. In the mid-19th-century, barracks, an arsenal, and pedestrian entry points were added. The structure stands near Verona Porta Vescovo railway station, the station for trains to Venice.
