= Bolzano/Bozen railway station =

Railway station in Italy

Bolzano Bozen
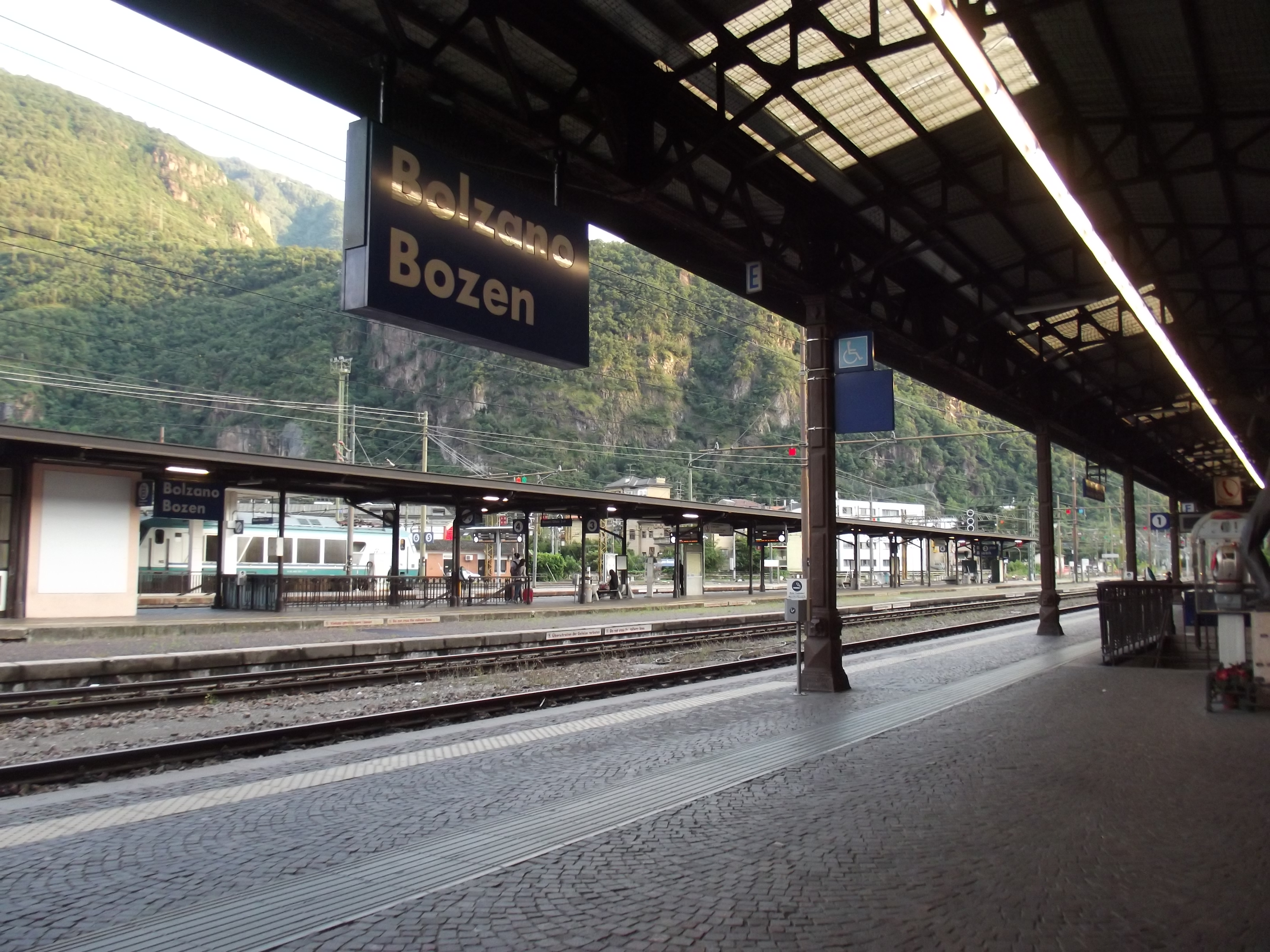
- View of the station from the platforms

General information
- Location: Piazza della Stazione 1 / Bahnhofplatz 1; 39100 Bolzano-Bozen; Bolzano (BZ), Trentino-Alto Adige/Südtirol; Italy
- Coordinates: 46°29′48″N 11°21′30″E
- Operator: Rete Ferroviaria Italiana; Centostazioni
- Lines: Verona–Innsbruck; Bolzano–Merano; Bolzano–Mals
- Distance: 150.23 km (93.35 mi) from Verona Porta Vescovo
- Platforms: 7 for long distance 4 bay platforms (1 for regional trains)
- Train operators: Trenitalia; ÖBB-DB
- Connections: Urban and interurban buses

Construction
- Architect: Angiolo Mazzoni

Other information
- IATA code: BZQ
- Classification: Gold

History
- Opened: 16 May 1859; 167 years ago
- Rebuilt: 1927-1929
Location
- Location within Trentino-Alto Adige/Südtirol Location within Northern Italy Location within Italy

Bolzano/Bozen railway station (IATA: BZQ) (Italian: Stazione di Bolzano, German: Bozen Bahnhof) is the main station of Bolzano, capital of the autonomous province of South Tyrol, in northeastern Italy.

The station was opened in 1859 by the Austrian Empire's Südbahn. It is located on the trans-Alpine Brenner Railway and a terminus of a branch line to Merano, which continues to become Vinschgau Railway Merano-Mals.

The station is currently managed by Rete Ferroviaria Italiana (RFI). The commercial area of the passenger building, however, is managed by Centostazioni. Train services to and from the station are operated by Trenitalia, ÖBB-DB, Südtirol Bahn and Russian Railways (RZD).

== Location ==
Bolzano/Bozen railway station is situated at Piazza della Stazione / Bahnhofplatz, at the southeastern edge of the city centre and a short, 5-minute walk away.

== History ==
The station was opened on 16 May 1859, upon the completion of the Trento-Bolzano section of the Brenner Railway. It was known as Bozen-Gries Bahnhof. The passenger building was designed by the Bozner architect Sebastian Altmann.

=== County of Tyrol ===
In 1864, construction began on the final section of the Brenner Railway between Bolzano and Innsbruck. This section was completed on 24 August 1867.

In 1871, rail services in the area were enhanced by the inauguration of the Puster Valley Railway, which connected Bolzano directly to Maribor through Innichen and Lienz. Train services today require three changes at Brixen, Lienz and Graz and are separately operated by Trenitalia, Südtirol Bahn, ÖBB and Slovenian Railways (SZ).

In 1881, a third railway line, Vinschgau railway, joined the Bolzano/Bozen station through Merano, County of Tyrol's capital city. In order to cater for frequent holiday makers, it was extended in 1906 from Merano to Mals.

From 1898 to 1974, Bolzano/Bozen was the terminus of the Überetsch Railway to Kaltern an der Weinstraße.

=== Transfer to Italy ===
After the First World War, the Treaty of Saint-Germain-en-Laye (1919) rewarded Italy with County of Tyrol's territory south of the Brenner Pass. As a result, Bozen-Gries station was transferred to the Italian railway network and came under the management of the Ferrovie dello Stato Italiane.

From 1927 to 1929, the station building was replaced by one in the style of Italy's fascist regime. It was designed by the architect Angiolo Mazzoni. The facade on the access road to the station was reworked into two half-columns and flanked by two statues, which were crafted by the Austrian artist Franz Ehrenhöfer, to represent electricity and steam. Ehrenhöfer also created masks on the cornices for the station complex, a fountain of St. Christopher and an allegory of Adige above the entrance to the clock tower,

== Features ==
The passenger building hosts the main ticket office, Deutsche Bahn ticket office and a waiting room. Other facilities include a cafe-bar and a newsagent store. There are six platforms for passenger service and additional tracks for freight traffic.

== Train services ==
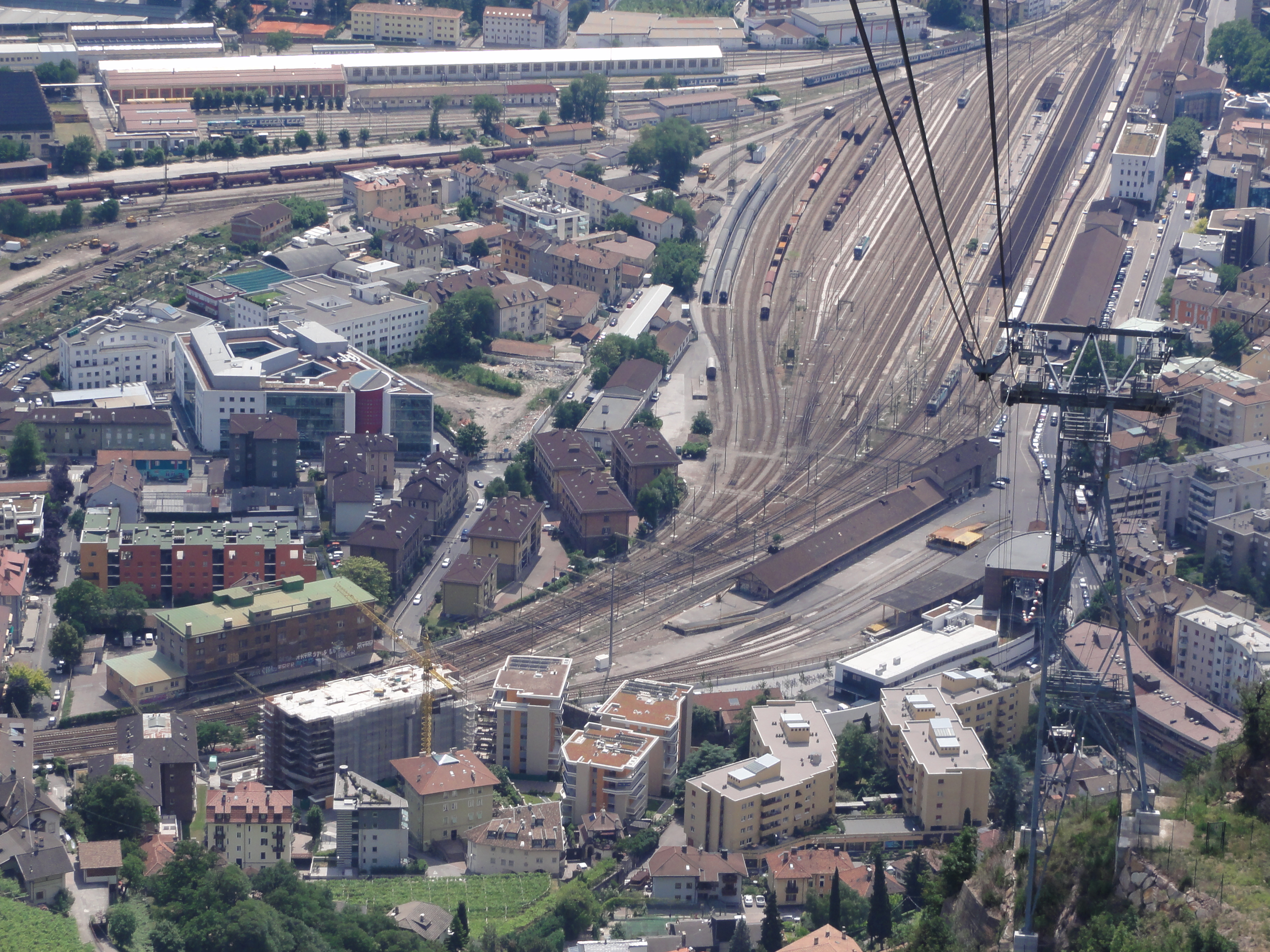
Aerial view of the station.

The station has 5.5 million passenger movements per year and is therefore the busiest within the region in terms of passenger numbers.

Between 2010 and 2022, the station has been a stop for the weekly EuroNight train of Russian Railways between Moscow and Nice.

Germany, Austria and South Tyrol

(D for Germany, A for Austria)

- Night Train (ÖBB Nightjet) Munich-Milan: Munich (D) - Rosenheim (D) - Salzburg (A) - Villach (A) - Padua - Vicenza - Verona - Peschiera del Garda - Brescia - Milan
- Night Train (ÖBB Nightjet) Munich-Rome: Munich (D) - Rosenheim (D) - Salzburg (A) - Villach (A) - Padua - Vicenza - Verona - Bologna - Florence - Chianciano Terme - Rome
- Intercity Train (ÖBB Eurocity) Munich-Verona/Venice: Munich (D) - Rosenheim (D) - Kufstein (A) - Wörgl (A) - Jenbach (A) - Innsbruck (A) - Brennero/Brenner - Fortezza/Franzensfeste - Bressanone/Brixen - Bolzano/Bozen - Trento - Rovereto - Verona - (Padua) - (Venice)
- Intercity Train (ÖBB Eurocity) Munich-Verona/Bologna: Munich (D) - Rosenheim (D) - Kufstein (A) - Wörgl (A) - Jenbach (A) - Innsbruck (A) - Brennero/Brenner - Fortezza/Franzensfeste - Bressanone/Brixen - Bolzano/Bozen - Trento - (Rovereto) - Verona - (Bologna)
- Regional Train (Trenitalia Regional) Brennero/Brenner-Merano/Meran: Brennero/Brenner - Vipiteno/Sterzing - Campo di Trens/Freienfeld - Fortezza/Franzensfeste - Bressanone/Brixen - Chiusa/Klausen - Bolzano/Bozen - Terlano/Terlan - Merano/Meran
- Regional Train (Südtirol Bahn Regio-Express) Bozen-Innsbruck: Bolzano/Bozen - Bressanone/Brixen - Fortezza/Franzensfeste - Brennero/Brenner - Innsbruck
- Night Train Motorail (car carrier), summer only) Hamburg-Verona: Hamburg-Altona station (D) - Hannover - Göttingen - Fulda - Munich (D) - Kufstein (A) - Innsbruck (A) - Bolzano/Bozen - Verona Porta Nuova

Italy

- High-speed Train (Italo) Bolzano/Bozen-Rome: Bolzano/Bozen - Trento - Rovereto - Verona - Bologna - Florence - Rome
- High-speed Train (Trenitalia Frecciargento) Bolzano/Bozen-Naples: Bolzano/Bozen - Trento - Rovereto - Verona - Bologna - Florence - Rome - (Naples)
- High-speed Train (Trenitalia Frecciargento) Bolzano/Bozen-Sibari: Bolzano/Bozen - Trento - Rovereto - Verona - Bologna - Florence - Rome Tiburtina - Rome Termini - Naples Afragola - Salerno - Scalea-Santa Domenica Talao - Paola - Torano-Lattarico - Sibari
- Regional Train (Trenitalia Regional) Brennero/Brenner-Bologna: Brennero/Brenner - Vipiteno/Sterzing - Campo di Trens/Freienfeld - Fortezza/Franzensfeste - Bressanone/Brixen - Chiusa/Klausen - Bolzano/Bozen - Ora/Auer - Mezzocorona - Trento - Rovereto - Ala - Verona - Isola della Scala - Nogara - Ostiglia - Mirandola - Bologna
- Regional Train (Trenitalia Regional) Bolzano/Bozen-Ala: Bolzano/Bozen - Laives/Leifers - Ora/Auer - Egna/Neumarkt - Salorno/Salurn - Mezzocorona - Trento - Rovereto - Mori - Ala
- Regional Train (Trenitalia Regional) Bolzano/Bozen-Bassano del Grappa: Bolzano/Bozen - Ora/Auer - Trento - San Cristoforo al Lago-Ischia - Bassano del Grappa - (Castelfranco Veneto) - (Venice)

Cross-border

(A for Austria, F for France, CZ for Czech Republic, I for Italy, PL for Poland, BR for Belarus, R for Russia, MN for Monaco)

- Intercity Train (RZD EuroNight) Moscow-Nice: Moscow (Belorusskaja) (R) - Wjasma (R) - Smolensk (R) - Orscha Central (BR) - Minsk (BR) - Brest Central (BR) - Terespol (PL) - Warsaw West (Wschodnia) (PL) - Warsaw Central (Centralna) (PL)- Katowice (PL) - Zebrzydowice (PL) - Bohumin (CZ) - Breclav (CZ) - Vienna/Wien (A) - Linz-Donau (A) - Innsbuck (A) - Bolzano/Bozen (I) - Verona (I) - Milan (Rogoredo) (I) - Genoa (Piazza Principe) (I) - San Remo (I) - Ventimiglia (I) - Menton (F) - Monaco Monte-Carlo (MN) - Nice (F)

== See also ==
- History of rail transport in Italy
- List of railway stations in Trentino-Alto Adige/Südtirol
- Rail transport in Italy
- Railway stations in Italy
