= Milan–Verona high-speed railway =

Italian high-speed railway line

Overview
- Status: Under construction
- Owner: RFI
- Locale: Italy
- Termini: Milano Lambrate railway station; Verona Porta Nuova railway station

Service
- Type: Heavy rail
- Operator(s): Trenitalia

History
- Opened: In stages between 2000 and 2023

Technical
- Line length: 165 km (103 mi)
- Number of tracks: Double track
- Track gauge: 1,435 mm (4 ft 8 1/2 in) standard gauge
- Electrification: 3 kV DC (Padua–Venice section); 25 kV 50 Hz AC (Milan–Brescia section)
- Operating speed: 300 km/h (186 mph)

The Milan–Verona high-speed railway is an Italian 165-kilometre (103-mile) long high-speed railway line, that is partly open and partly under construction to connect Milan with Verona. The route operates through the regions of Lombardy and Veneto. The line is part of Railway axis 6 of the Trans-European rail network (TEN-T) on the Pan-European Corridor V. The line will replace the Milan–Venice railway for high-speed trains.

In 2007, the first phase of construction was completed and opened, between Milan Lambrate and Treviglio. In 2016, the second phase between Treviglio and Brescia was completed. Construction of the remaining section to Verona is still in progress; it is expected to be completed in 2022 or 2023. High speed trains travel on the new line until Brescia, then move to the conventional line for the remaining section.

The stretch to be built between Milan and Verona will measure a total of around 165 kilometres (103 mi). The route will pass through 31 municipalities in Lombardy and 4 in Veneto.

The signal system on the existing line is the same as on most of the conventional lines, while that of the under construction section will feature ERTMS/ETCS, which ensures interoperability between the European rail lines.

== Construction ==
=== Milan-Treviglio section ===
The project between Milan and Treviglio was approved in 1995. The connection between the Lambrate station in Milan and the station Pioltello-Limito was completed in 2000, while the 30-kilometre segment between Milan and Treviglio was opened on 10 June 2007, for a cost of €290 million.

=== Treviglio-Brescia section ===
The final design of the segment between Treviglio and Brescia was approved by CIPE in November 2007, with €2.05 billion in funding provided by the Economic Financial Planning Document (DPEF) between 2007 and 2011. On 7 March 2011, an agreement was signed between Rete Ferroviaria Italiana and Cepav Due for the first part of the project, valued at €700 million. Work began in May 2012 and the Treviglio–Brescia segment was completed in 2016. High-speed service between Milan and Brescia began on 11 December 2016, with an advertised travel time of 36 minutes between the two cities.

=== Brescia-Verona section ===
The section of the Brescia Est – Verona high speed line has been approved in 2016 and construction started with a projected opening in 2026. This section of the high speed rail is under construction alongside the A4 Milan-Venice motorway and the conventional railway line. It crosses the Lombardy and Veneto Regions, 11 municipalities within the provinces of Brescia, Verona and Mantua (the latter only for road work purposes) and foresees for the construction of a railway track extending approximately 48 kilometres (30 mi), including 2.2 kilometres (1.4 mi) for the Verona Merci interconnection linking the Verona-Brenner railway axis.

=== Verona-Padua line ===
Beyond Verona, the Verona-Padua line is divided into three lots of which the first lot between Verona and the junction (bivio) at Vicenza started construction in 2021; it is expected to open in 2026. This first section will run for 44.2 km (27.5 mi) across 13 municipalities, quadrupling the existing railway. The Verona-Padua project's construction is valued at a combined total of approximately €4.8 billion. At 76.5 kilometres (47.5 mi) in length, the railway will serve as an important link across Italy's northeast.

== The route ==
Leaving Milan Centrale station, the railway shares a common route with conventional tracks to Milan Lambrate station. After leaving Lambrate, it branches off east towards the Milan–Venice railway to Verona and Bergamo. At Melzo (near Pozzuolo station), the high-speed line divides from the historical route west of Treviglio station. This junction at Treviglio West will enable connection of the currently separate Treviglio and Treviglio West (Ovest) stations.

The dedicated high-speed section between Treviglio and Brescia is 39.6 kilometres (24.6 mi) long. The project approved by the CIPE involved the construction of a new high-speed, high capacity railway that bypasses the city of Bergamo to the south, reaching Brescia along a trajectory that is mostly separate from the conventional line.

The new track branches from the future junction at Treviglio West to follow the A35 motorway to the municipality of Castrezzato. From this location, at the completion of the railway line up to Verona, there will be a branch to Brescia West junction, joining with the conventional route. This junction will join the conventional line near Ospitaletto to arrive at the station of Brescia.

== See also ==
- List of railway lines in Italy
