= Desenzano del Garda–Sirmione railway station =

Railway station in Lombardy, Italy

Desenzano
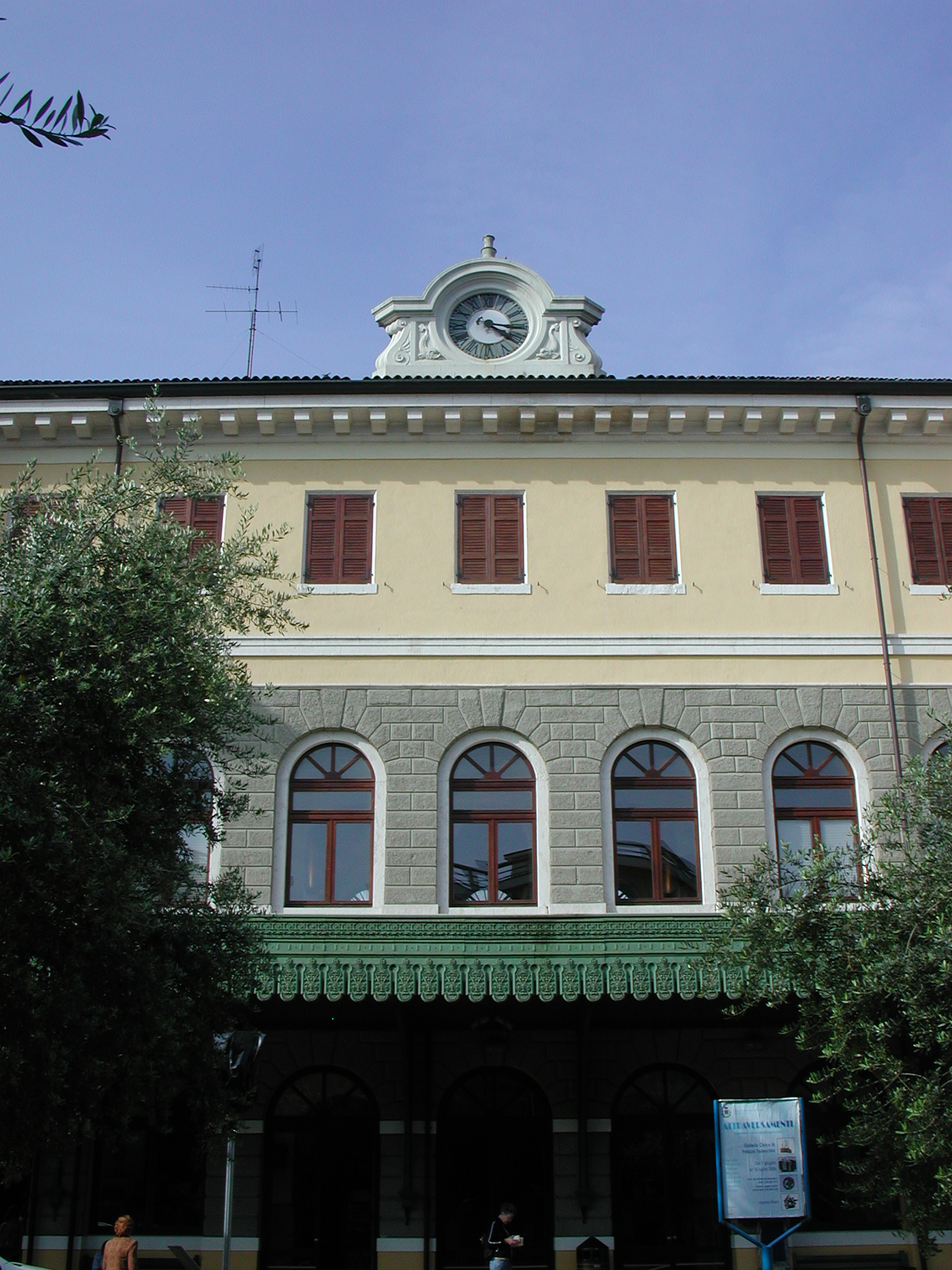

General information
- Location: Piazza Einaudi 10; 25015 Desenzano del Garda; Desenzano del Garda, Brescia, Lombardy; Italy
- Coordinates: 45°27′46″N 10°32′11″E
- Operator: Rete Ferroviaria Italiana; Centostazioni
- Line: Milano–Venezia
- Distance: 110.738 km (68.809 mi) from Milano Centrale
- Train operators: Trenitalia; Trenord
- Connections: Urban and suburban buses

Other information
- Classification: Gold

History
- Opened: 12 April 1854; 172 years ago

Services
Preceding station	Trenitalia	Following station
Brescia towards Milano Centrale	Frecciarossa	Verona Porta Nuova towards Udine
Brescia towards Milano Centrale	Frecciarossa	Verona Porta Nuova towards Trieste Centrale
Brescia towards Milano Centrale	Frecciarossa	Peschiera del Garda towards Venezia Santa Lucia
Preceding station	ÖBB	Following station
Brescia towards La Spezia Centrale	Nightjet	Peschiera del Garda towards München Hbf
Brescia towards Roma Termini	Nightjet	Peschiera del Garda towards Wien Hbf
Preceding station	Trenord	Following station
Brescia towards Milano Centrale	RE6	Peschiera del Garda towards Verona Porta Nuova
Location
- Location within Lombardy Location within Northern Italy Location within Italy

Desenzano del Garda–Sirmione station (Italian: Stazione di Desenzano del Garda-Sirmione) is a railway station serving the town and comune of Desenzano del Garda, in the region of Lombardy, northern Italy. Opened in 1854, it forms part of the Milan–Venice railway.

The station is currently managed by Rete Ferroviaria Italiana (RFI). However, the commercial area of the passenger building is managed by Centostazioni. Each of these companies is a subsidiary of Ferrovie dello Stato (FS), Italy's state-owned rail company. Train services are operated by Trenitalia and Trenord.

== Location ==
Desenzano del Garda–Sirmione railway station is situated in Piazza Einaudi, at the end of Viale Cavour, near the southern edge of the town centre.

== History ==
The station was opened on 12 April 1854, together with the bridge at Peschiera del Garda on the Mincio river, and the Desenzano Viaduct. Between 1909 and 1969, it was also a junction station for a short line to Desenzano Harbour, on Lake Garda.

== Features ==
The passenger building is a rectangular structure made of stone. It has a total of three storeys, only two of which rise above track level. Until the late nineteenth century, an iron shed with a sloping roof protected the first two tracks from the weather. During the steam era, the station was also equipped with a water tower formed of a simple iron tank raised and supported by concrete piers.

The station yard has six tracks. In addition to two running tracks for the Milan - Venice railway, there is a third track for overtaking, and three reserved for the composition and transit of freight trains or the storage of rail vehicles used for the maintenance of the line.

There are also two covered platforms serving the three tracks reserved for passenger service. Both are connected by an underpass, which also links the passenger building with the parking lot to the south, on the opposite side of the tracks.

From the third track, shortly after the switch (point) on the line heading towards Peschiera, is the location where the line to Desenzano Harbour, now abandoned, once branched off. Until the 1980s, a short section of line remained in place there for use in connection with the nearby electrical substation.

== Train services ==
As of the December 2023 timetable change, the following services stop at Desenzano del Garda-Sirmione:

- Frecciarossa: services to Genova Brignole, Milano Centrale, Torino Porta Nuova, Trieste Centrale, Venezia Santa Lucia, and Udine.
- NightJet: service to La Spezia Centrale, Roma Termini, München, and Wien.
- RegioExpress: service between Milano Centrale and Verona Porta Nuova.
- Regionale: service between Brescia and Venezia Santa Lucia.

In 2010, the station has about 1.5 million passenger movements each year.

== See also ==
- History of rail transport in Italy
- List of railway stations in Lombardy
- Rail transport in Italy
- Railway stations in Italy
