= Trento railway station =

Railway station in Italy

Trento
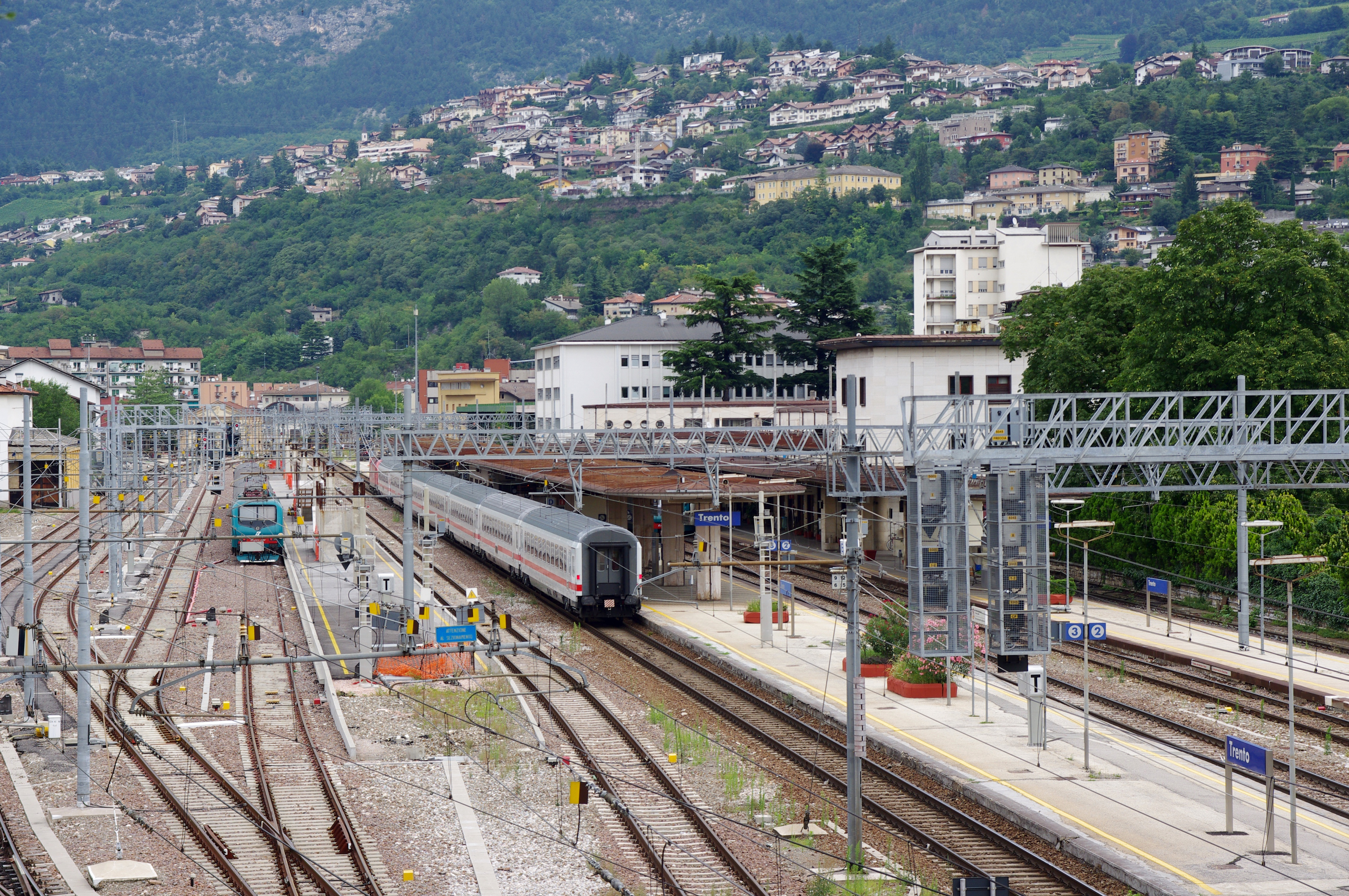
- View of the station yard

General information
- Location: Piazza Dante; 38122 Trento; Trento (TN), Trentino-Alto Adige/Südtirol; Italy
- Coordinates: 46°04′19″N 11°07′10″E
- Operator: Rete Ferroviaria Italiana; Centostazioni
- Lines: Verona–Innsbruck; Trento–Venezia
- Distance: 94.79 km (58.90 mi) from Verona Porta Vescovo
- Train operators: Trenitalia; ÖBB-DB
- Connections: Trento–Malè–Marilleva railway (FTM); Urban and interurban buses

Other information
- Classification: Gold

History
- Opened: 23 March 1859; 167 years ago
Location
- Location within Trentino-Alto Adige/Südtirol Location within Northern Italy Location within Italy

Trento railway station (Italian: Stazione Ferroviaria di Trento, German: Bahnhof Trient) is the main station of Trento, capital of the autonomous province of Trentino, in northeastern Italy.

The station was opened in 1859 by the Austrian Empire's Südbahn. It is located on the trans-Alpine Brenner Railway connecting Verona to Innsbruck. It is also a terminus of two branch lines: Valsugana Railway (to Levico Terme) and Trento-Malè metre-gauged railway.

The station is currently managed by Rete Ferroviaria Italiana (RFI). The commercial area of the passenger building, however, is managed by Centostazioni, whereas train services are operated by Trenitalia and ÖBB-DB.

== Location ==
Trento railway station is situated at Piazza Dante, the northwestern edge of the city centre and on the east bank of River Adige (River Etsch).

== Features ==
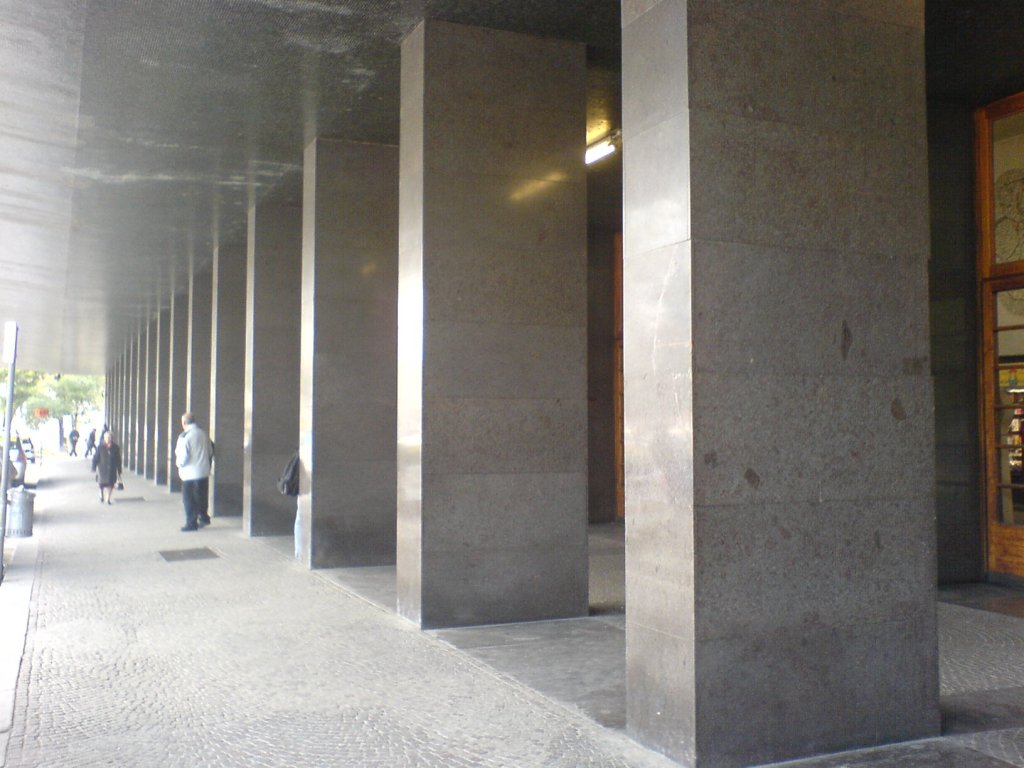
The external colonnade

The passenger building hosts the ticket office, a waiting room, two newsagent stores and a cafe bar.

The station has four tracks and three through platforms. At the southern end, there is a bay platform for trains operating on the Valsugana Railway. The metre-gauged railway station of the same name is located at the northern end. In addition, there is a locomotive shed for siding train carriages overnight. The goods yard is situated at Roncaforte district, a short distance to the north of the station.

== Train services ==
The station has five million passenger movements per year and is therefore the second busiest, after Bozen/Bolzano, within the region in terms of passenger numbers.

The following services call at the station:

Domestic

- High-speed Train (Trenitalia Frecciargento) Bolzano/Bozen-Naples: Bolzano/Bozen - Trento/Trient - Verona - Bologna - Florence - Rome - (Naples)
- Regional Train (Trenitalia Regional Express or Regional) Brennero/Brenner-Bologna: Brennero/Brenner - Fortezza/Franzensfeste - Bressanone/Brixen - Chuisa/Klausen - Bolzano/Bozen - Trento/Trient - Rovereto/Rofreit - Verona - Isola della Scala - Nogara - Bologna
- Regional Train (Trenitalia Regional): Bolzano/Bozen - Ora/Auer - Trento/Trient - San Cristoforo al Lago-Ischia - Bassano del Grappa - (Castelfranco Veneto) - (Venice)
- Regional Train (Trenitalia Regional) Bolzano/Bozen-Ala/Ahl-am-Etsch: Bolzano/Bozen - Laives/Leifers - Ora/Aura - Egna/Neumarkt - Salorno/Salurn - Mezzocorona/Kronmetz - Trento/Trient - Rovereto/Rofreit - Mori - Ala/Ahl-am-Etsch
- Night Train (Trenitalia Intercity Notte) Bolzano/Bozen-Rome: Bolzano/Bozen - Trento/Trient - Rovereto/Rofreit - Verona - Bologna - Florence - Rome
- Metre-gauge Train (Trentino-Trasporti Val di Non Line) Trento/Trient-Malè: Trento/Trient - Mezzolombardo - Cles - Malè - Mezzana

Cross-border

(D for Germany, A for Austria)

- Intercity Train (ÖBB Eurocity) Munich-Verona/Venice: Munich(D) - Rosenheim (D) - Kufstein(A) - Wörgl (A) - Jenbach(A) - Innsbruck(A) - Bolzano/Bozen - Trento/Trient - Rovereto/Rofreit - Verona - (Padua) - (Venice)
- Intercity Train (ÖBB Eurocity) Munich-Verona/Bologna: Munich(D) - Rosenheim (D) - Kufstein(A) - Wörgl (A) - Jenbach(A) - Innsbruck(A) - Bolzano/Bozen - Trento/Trient - Rovereto/Rofreit - Verona - (Bologna)

== See also ==
- History of rail transport in Italy
- List of railway stations in Trentino-Alto Adige/Südtirol
- Rail transport in Italy
- Railway stations in Italy
