= Merano–Maia Bassa/Meran–Untermais railway station =

Railway station in South Tyrol, Italy

Merano–Maia Bassa Meran–Untermais
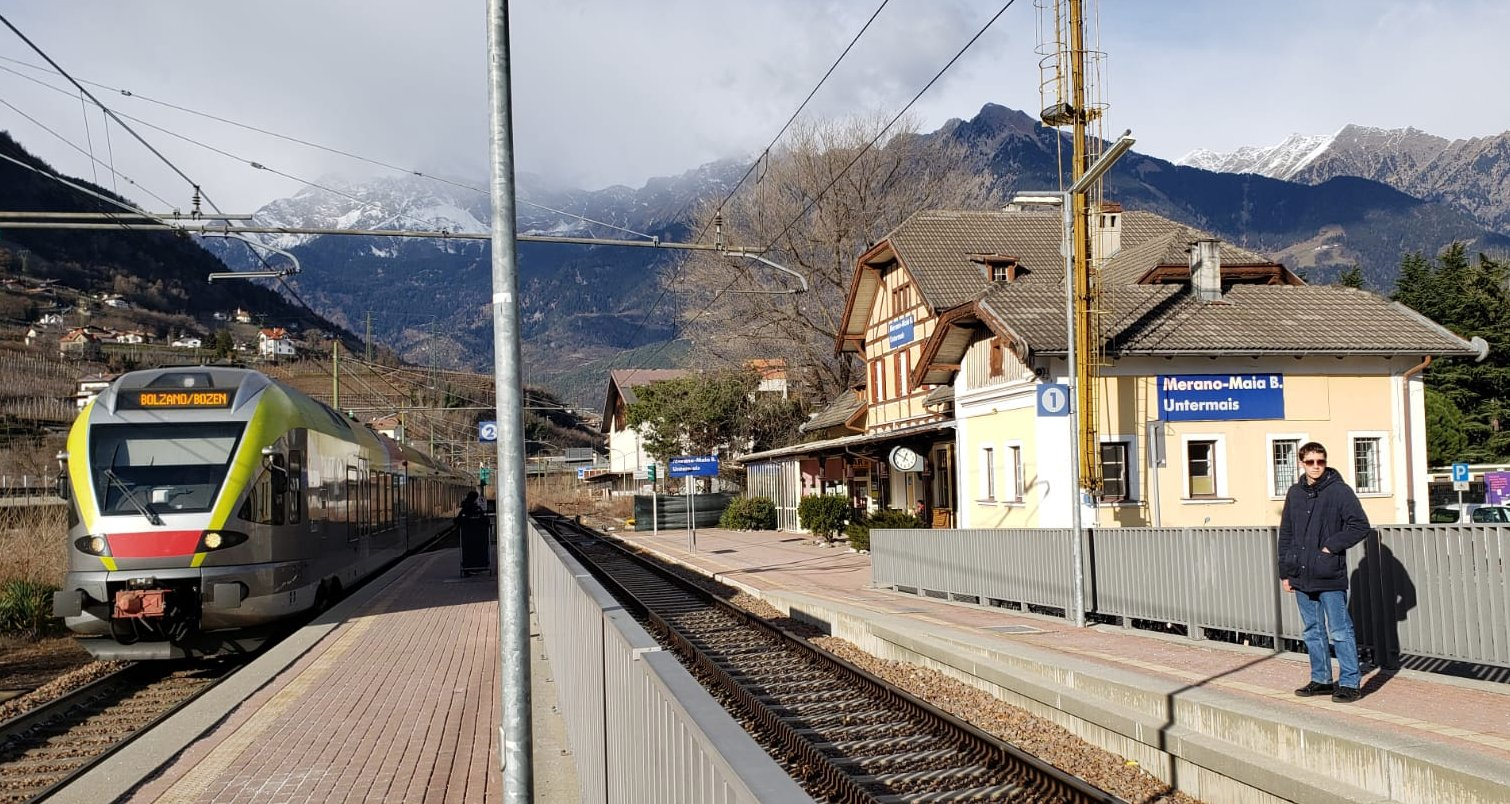
- A Bolzano/Bozen-bound train arrives on track 2. The station building is on the right

General information
- Location: Via delle Palade/Gampenstraße 111, Merano/Meran, South Tyrol; Italy
- Coordinates: 46°39′23″N 11°08′53″E
- Line: Bolzano/Bozen – Merano/Meran
- Tracks: 2
- Train operators: Trenitalia
Location
- Location within Trentino-Alto Adige/Südtirol Location within Northern Italy Location within Italy

Merano–Maia Bassa/Meran–Untermais (Italian: Stazione di Merano–Maia Bassa, German: Bahnhof Meran–Untermais) is a railway station in the southwestern part of the town of Merano/Meran in South Tyrol, northern Italy. The station is on the Bolzano/Bozen to Merano/Meran line between the stations of Lana-Postal/Lana-Burgstal and Merano/Meran. It has two tracks and two low-level platforms. The station building has a waiting room, bar and toilets. A commuter car park is adjacent to the station.

The Meran Hippodrome is located near the station.

== History ==
The station was opened in 1881 in a then-independent commune of Untermais, which became part of Merano in 1924. From 1906 to 1950, the Lana-Meran tram had a stop and crossed the railway line near the station.

== Services ==
The typical workday timetable is:

- 2 tph (train per hour) to Merano/Meran
- 2 tph to Bolzano/Bozen, one of which continues to Brennero/Brenner
