= Peschiera del Garda railway station =

Railway station in Italy

Peschiera del Garda
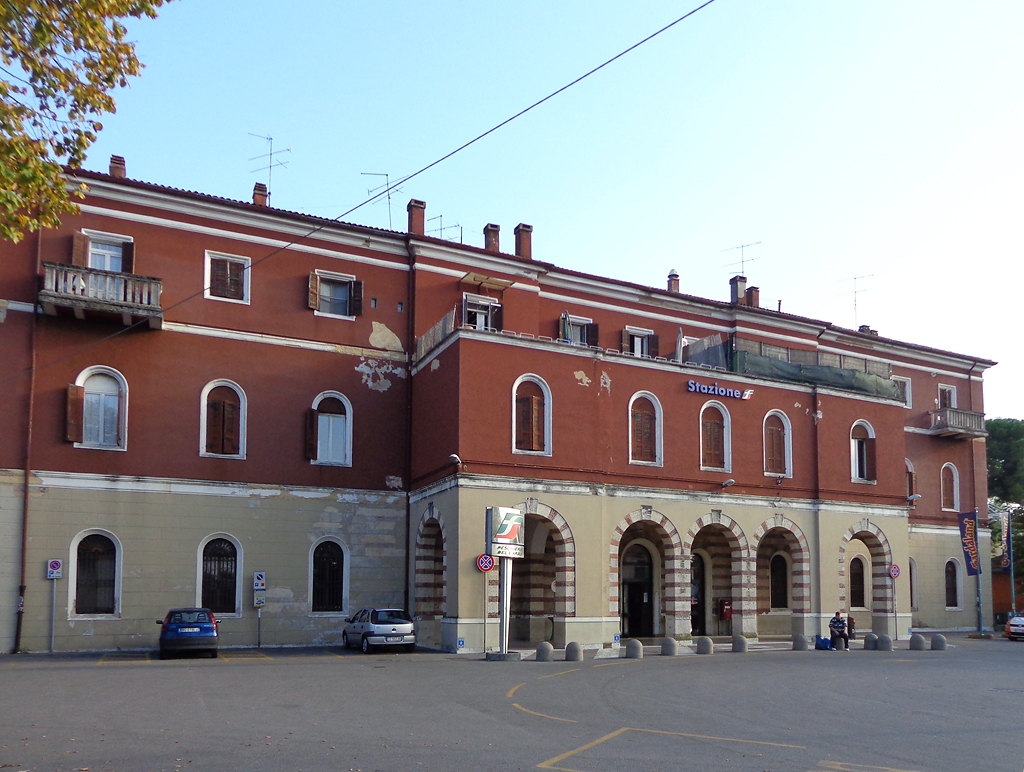

General information
- Location: Piazzale Stazione 1; 37019 Peschiera del Garda VR; Peschiera del Garda, Verona, Veneto; Italy
- Coordinates: 45°26′19″N 10°42′08″E
- Operator: Rete Ferroviaria Italiana
- Line: Milano–Venezia
- Distance: 124.940 km (77.634 mi) from Milano Centrale
- Train operators: Trenitalia; Trenord
- Connections: Urban buses, and suburban to Mantua, Verona, Garda, Sirmione Shuttle bus to Gardaland

Other information
- Classification: Gold

History
- Opened: 22 April 1854; 172 years ago

Services
Preceding station	Trenitalia	Following station
Desenzano del Garda-Sirmione towards Milano Centrale	Frecciarossa	Verona Porta Nuova towards Venezia Santa Lucia
Brescia towards Genève-Cornavin	EuroCity	Verona Porta Nuova towards Milano Centrale or Venezia Santa Lucia
Preceding station	ÖBB	Following station
Desenzano del Garda-Sirmione towards La Spezia Centrale	Nightjet	Verona Porta Nuova towards München Hbf
Desenzano del Garda-Sirmione towards Roma Termini	Nightjet	Verona Porta Nuova towards Wien Hbf
Preceding station	Trenord	Following station
Desenzano del Garda-Sirmione towards Milano Centrale	RE6	Verona Porta Nuova Terminus
Location
- Location within Veneto Location within Northern Italy Location within Italy

Peschiera del Garda railway station (Italian: Stazione di Peschiera del Garda) serves the town and comune of Peschiera del Garda, in the region of Veneto, northern Italy. Opened in 1854, it forms part of the Milan–Venice railway.

The station is currently managed by Rete Ferroviaria Italiana (RFI), a subsidiary of Ferrovie dello Stato (FS), Italy's state-owned rail company. The train services are operated by Trenitalia and Trenord.

== Location ==
Peschiera del Garda railway station is situated in Piazzale Stazione, on the eastern bank of the Mincio River, to the east of the town centre on the western bank.

== History ==
The station was opened on 22 April 1854, together with the Verona–Brescia–Coccaglio section of the Milan–Venice railway. Between 1859 and 1866, it was a transit station between the international network of the Kingdom of Lombardy–Venetia and that of the Kingdom of Sardinia/Italy.

From 1934 to 1967, the station was adjacent to another station, the FMP station, which was the terminus of a line from Mantua.

== Features ==
The station has a large three storey passenger building. At ground level, there is a main entrance protected by an arched portico, and inside are the usual services to travellers. The upper two levels are used for offices and private residences.

Three tracks pass through the station yard. Each of the outer tracks, one for each direction, is faced by a platform equipped with a wrought iron canopy. The platforms are connected with each other, and with the passenger building, by elevators and a pedestrian underpass. The inside track is used for any crossings or overtaking.

In the goods yard is a goods shed now used for storage. The tracks in the goods yard have been removed and replaced with a parking lot. Other tracks are used for storage of line maintenance equipment.

== Services ==
As of the December 2023 timetable change, the following services stop at Peschiera del Garda:

- Frecciarossa: services to Milano Centrale, Torino Porta Nuova, and Venezia Santa Lucia.
- NightJet: service to La Spezia Centrale, Roma Termini, München, and Wien.
- EuroCity: service between Genève-Cornavin and Venezia Santa Lucia.
- RegioExpress: service between Milano Centrale and Verona Porta Nuova.
- Regionale: service between Brescia and Venezia Santa Lucia.

== See also ==
- History of rail transport in Italy
- List of railway stations in Veneto
- Rail transport in Italy
- Railway stations in Italy
