= Sibari railway station =

Railway station in Italy

Sibari
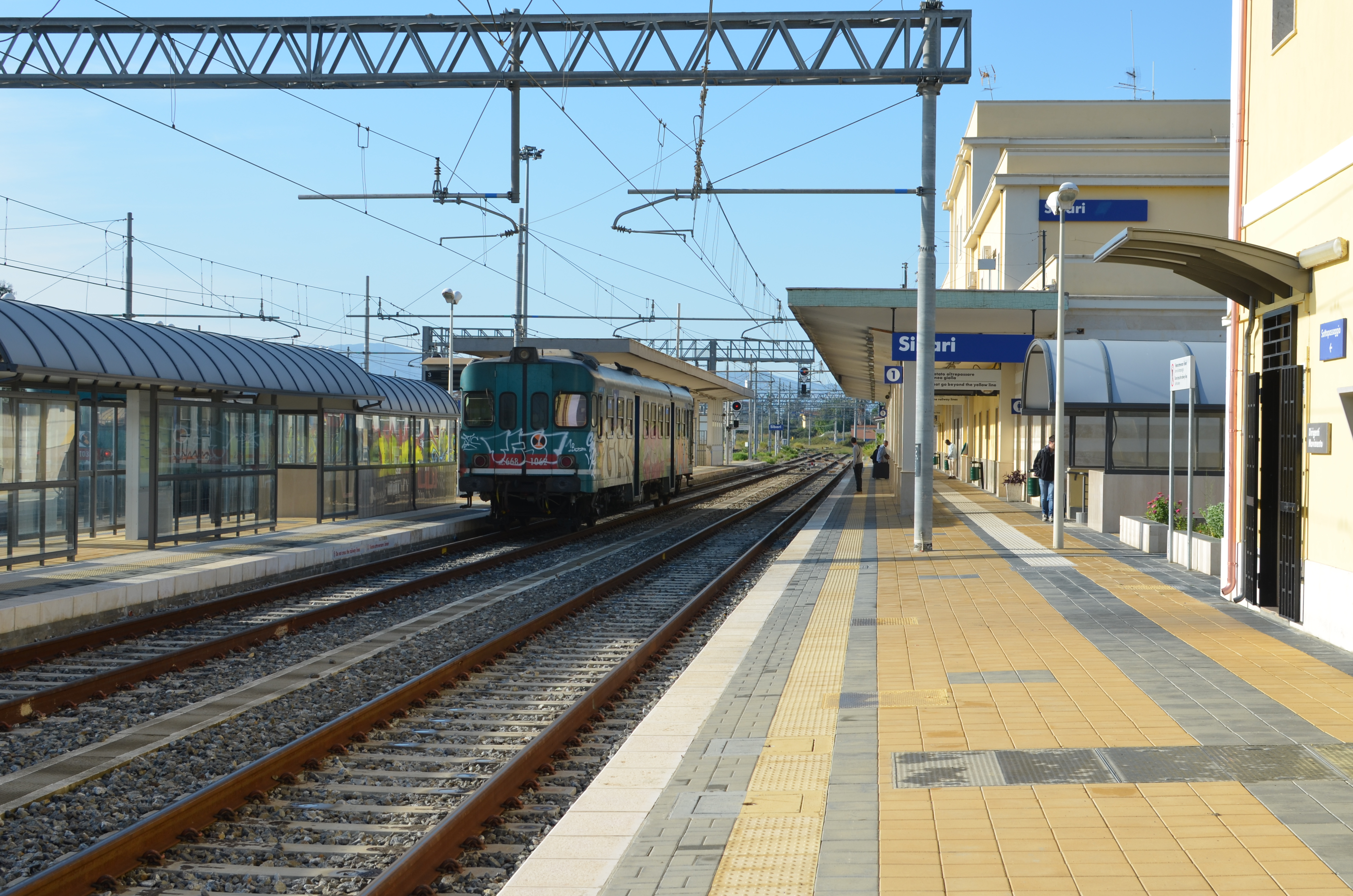
- Sibari railway station

General information
- Location: Via Stazione, Cassano allo Jonio, Sibari, Province of Cosenza, Calabria; Italy
- Coordinates: 39°44′57″N 16°27′25″E
- Owner: Rete Ferroviaria Italiana
- Operator: Trenitalia
- Lines: Jonica railway Cosenza–Sibari railway
- Platforms: 3

Other information
- Classification: Silver

History
- Opened: 1874; 152 years ago
Location
- Location within Calabria Location within Italy

Sibari is a railway station in Sibari, Italy. The station is located on the Jonica railway and Cosenza–Sibari railway. The train services are operated by Trenitalia.

== Train services ==
The station has several services:

- Intercity services Taranto - Sibari - Crotone - Catanzaro Lido - Roccela Jonica - Reggio Calabria
- Regional services (Treno regionale) Metaponto - Monte Girodano - Sibari
- Regional services (Treno regionale) Sibari - Crotone - Cantanzaro Lido
- Regional services (Treno regionale) Cosenza - Sibari
