= Schio railway station =

Railway station in Italy

Schio

General information
- Location: Schio, Vicenza, Veneto; Italy
- Coordinates: 45°42′37″N 11°21′30″E
- Owner: Rete Ferroviaria Italiana
- Line: Vicenza–Schio railway
- Platforms: 3
- Train operators: Trenitalia

Other information
- Classification: Silver

History
- Opened: 1876
Location
- Location within Veneto Location within Northern Italy Location within Italy

Schio (Italian: Stazione di Schio) is a railway station in the Italian town of Schio, in the Veneto region. The station lies on the Vicenza–Schio railway and the train services are operated by Trenitalia.

== Train services ==
The station is served by the following service(s):

- Local services (Treno regionale) Vicenza - Thiene - Schio
