= Verona Porta Vescovo railway station =

Railway station in Verona, Veneto, Italy

Verona Porta Vescovo
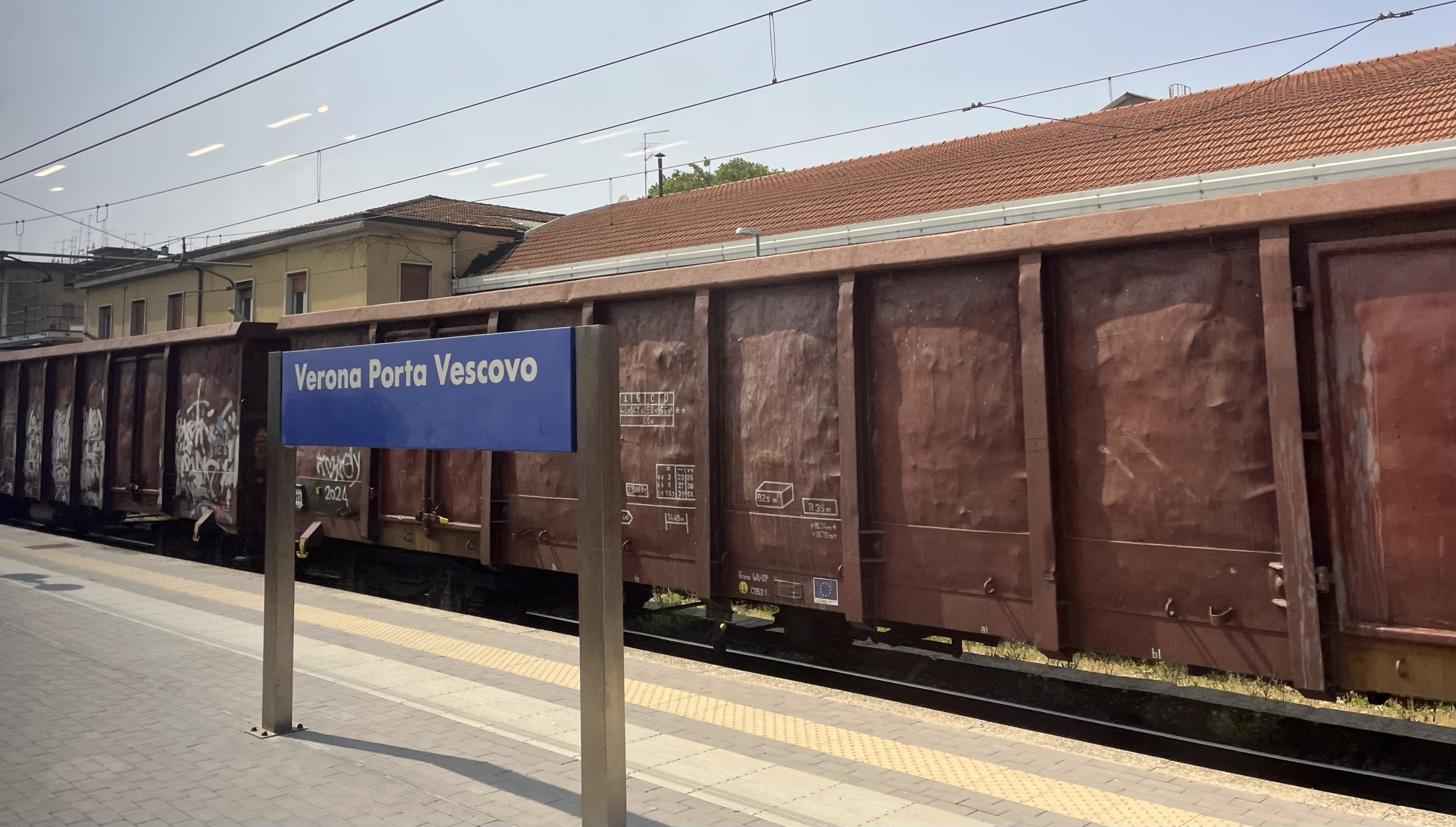

General information
- Location: Viale Stazione Porta Vescovo; Verona, Verona, Veneto; Italy
- Coordinates: 45°26′09″N 11°01′12″E
- Owner: Rete Ferroviaria Italiana
- Line: Milan–Venice
- Train operators: Trenitalia

Other information
- Classification: Silver

History
- Opened: 1847; 179 years ago
Location
- Location within Veneto Location within Northern Italy Location within Italy

Verona Porta Vescovo (Italian: Stazione di Verona Porta Vescovo) is a railway station serving the city of Verona, in the region of Veneto, northern Italy. The station opened in 1847 and is located on the Milan–Venice railway. The train services are operated by Trenitalia.

Porta Vescovo is the lesser of the two stations that serve Verona. It lies outside the 19th-century Habsburg city fortifications, a short distance from the eponymous city gate and a thirty-minute walk from the city centre. At one time, the station served the important military garrison and it was the major railway station for Verona. This changed as Porta Nuova station, south of the city was opened (in 1913) and developed into a major hub.

The station has a magazine stall and cafe, from where tickets are issued.

== Train services ==
The station is served by the following services:

- Express services (Regionale Veloce) Verona - Vicenza - Padua - Venice
- Express services ( Regionale Veloce ) Verona - Vicenza - Padua - Venice
- Regional services (Treno regionale) Verona - Vicenza - Padua - Venice

== See also ==
- History of rail transport in Italy
- List of railway stations in Veneto
- Rail transport in Italy
- Railway stations in Italy
