= Soave (wine) =

Dry white Italian wine

- Wine region
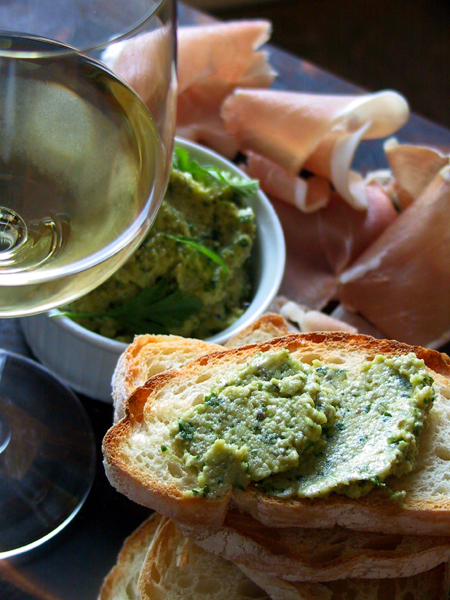
- Soave with a food pairing
- Type: Denominazione di origine controllata
- Year established: 1968
- Country: Italy
- Part of: Veneto
- Other regions in Veneto: Bardolino, Valpolicella, Gambellara
- Sub-regions: Soave Classico, Colli Scaligeri
- Size of planted vineyards: 4,527 hectares (11,190 acres)
- Varietals produced: Garganega, Trebbiano di Soave, Chardonnay
- Wine produced: 383,000 hectolitres (8,400,000 imp gal; 10,100,000 US gal)

Soave (/soʊˈɑːveɪ, ˈswɑːveɪ/ soh-AH-vay, SWAH-vay, Italian: [soˈaːve]) is a dry white Italian wine from the Veneto region, in northeast Italy, principally around the city of Verona. Within the Soave region are both a denominazione di origine controllata (DOC) zone and, since 2001, a denominazione di origine controllata e garantita (DOCG) designation known as Soave Superiore, with both zones being further sub-divided into a general and Classico designation for the wines produced in the heartland of the Soave region, around the sloping vineyards of Verona.

Throughout the Soave production zone Garganega is the principal grape variety, though Trebbiano di Soave and Chardonnay are permitted in varying percentages. While most Soave is dry, still wine, within the DOC zone a sparkling spumante style is permitted, as is the passito Recioto style, that in 1998 was granted its own DOCG designation for grapes grown in the hilly region.

== History ==
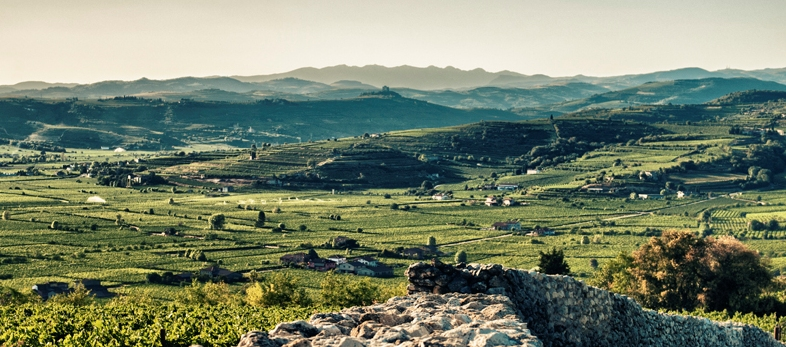
Vineyards in Soave, Veneto

Soave saw a peak of popularity in United States during the mid-20th-century Italian wine boom, that followed the end of World War II. Driven by the marketing efforts of large producers like Bolla, Soave even surpassed Chianti in the 1970s as the largest-selling Italian DOC wine in the US. By the end of the 20th century, Soave's share of US sales were eventually eclipsed by Pinot grigio and an influx of new wines from southern Italy.

The Soave DOC was created in 1968 with those boundaries revised and expanded periodically over the next few decades. As a point of introduction, it should be said that Soave and Chianti were the first zones in Italy (in 1931) to be recognized by Royal Decree as having the potential for producing fine wines. This document delimited the borders of the production zones which, in the case of Soave, coincide with those fixed under the current production regulations for Soave Classico. Situated in the eastern part of the Province of Vicenza, in the foothills of the Lessini Mountains, the Soave zone is a not particularly large wine region which, however, produces very significant quantities of wine, in virtue of the fact that the area under vine is one of the most specialized and densely planted in Europe. In this area, there exists a traditional and indissoluble link between viticulture and terroir; the area of specialized vineyards has remained practically unchanged compared to 100 years ago and, indeed, there does not seem to be any valid reason why it should increase.

In 2001, a separate Soave Superiore DOCG was created for the 2002 vintage, that included revised boundaries that covered some areas of the original classico zone and excluded others for reasons that wine expert Oz Clarke described as unclear and "byzantine". The revised boundaries and additional DOCG requirements, that dealt with vine training and other viticultural practices, promoted sharp criticism from Soave growers, and, beginning as early as 2003, several voluntarily withdrew themselves from the DOC/G and produced wines under IGT designations.

== Wine region ==
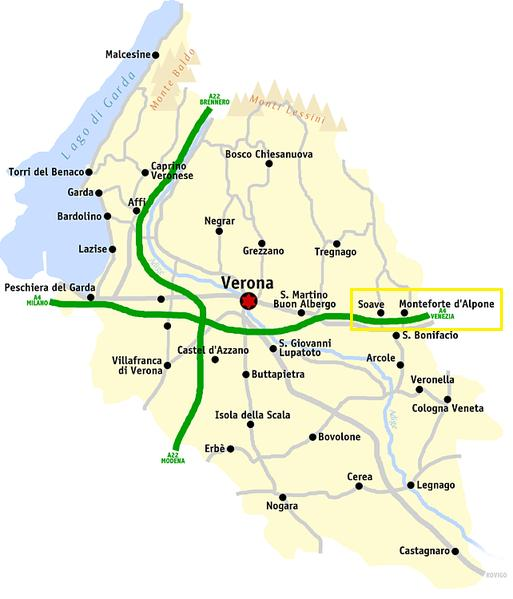
Province of Verona with the main communes of the Soave classico zone highlighted to the east

The Soave production zone is situated in the eastern part of the hills in the province of Verona (north of the Serenissima highway, between the 18th and 25th kilometres of the Verona-Venezia road). The zone includes part or all of the lands belonging to the municipalities of Soave, Monteforte d'Alpone, San Martino Buon Albergo, Lavagno, Mezzane, Caldiero, Colognola, Illasi, Cazzano, Roncà, Montecchia and San Giovanni Ilarione.

The climate of the Soave region is influenced by the mists that flow from the Po Valley in the autumn and can bring the viticultural hazards of mold and other grape diseases. The Garganega grape, that is the primary component of Soave, is a late-ripening variety with a thick skin that can withstand the mist better than some of the thinner skin varieties like Trebbiano toscano.

=== Classico ===
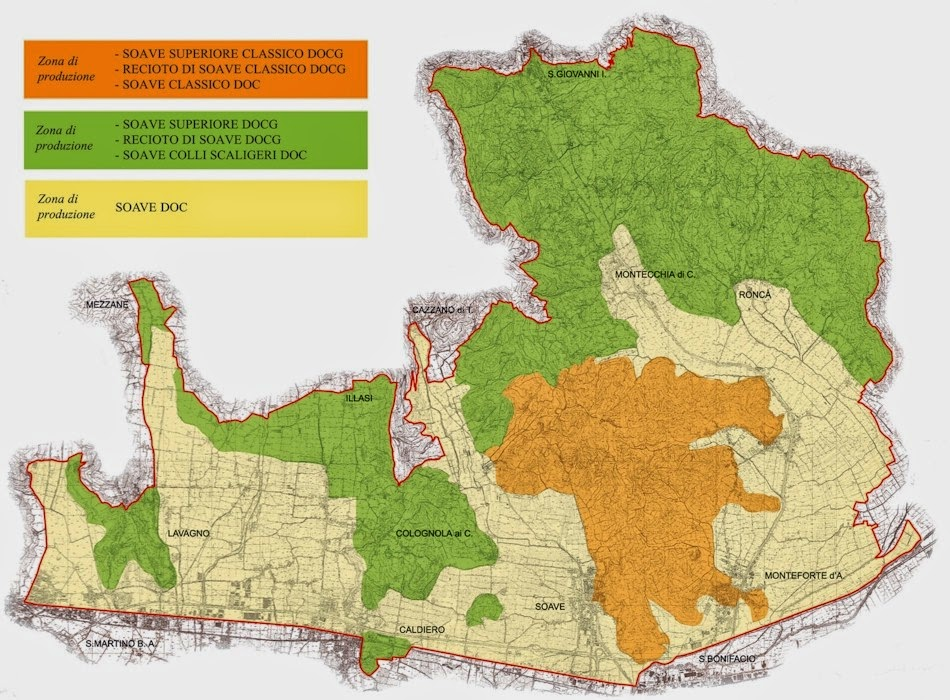
Soave production areas

The classico zone was first delineated by Veneto authorities in 1927 and originally encompassed 2,720 acres (1,100 ha) of hillside vineyards within the Soave zone. Today, the use of the specification "Classico" with the designation "Soave" is reserved for the product made from grapes harvested from the hillside vineyards around the municipalities of Soave and Monteforte d'Alpone, in the original and oldest classic "zone" of Verona.

The vineyard soils of this region are considerably less fertile than the alluvial soils in the plains. In the western part of the classico zone, near the commune of Soave, the soils contain a high percentage of limestone which retains the warmth of the afternoon sun and helps produce fuller, more fruit-forward wines. In the eastern vineyards, near Monteforte d'Alpone, the soils are made of decomposed volcanic rock that tends to produce what wine expert Jancis Robinson calls "steelier" wines.

== DOC/G requirements ==
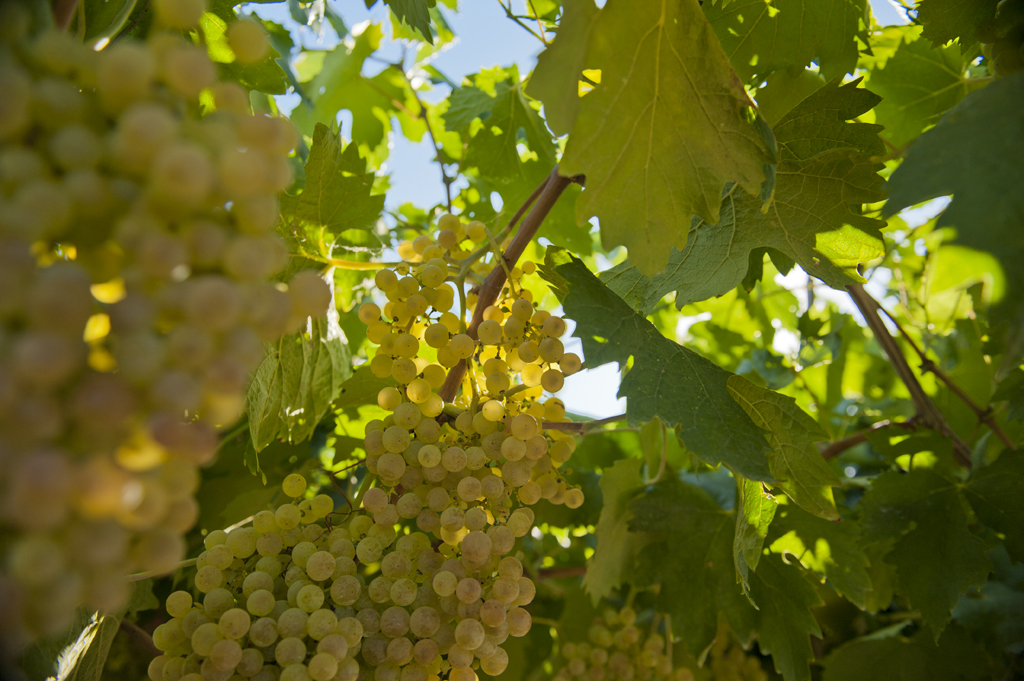
Garganega is the principal grape of Soave.

Only white wine is produced in the Soave region, and a minimum of 70% must be the Garganega grape. For Soave DOC wine, up to 30% of the blend can come from Trebbiano di Soave, also known as Verdicchio and Nestrano. This grape is distinct from the lower quality Trebbiano toscano variety of Tuscany (also known as the Ugni blanc grape used in Cognac production). The DOC rules place new emphasis on the quality varieties and exclude Trebbiano toscano, which had been allowed to constitute up to 15% of the blend. All the grapes used for the DOC wine must be harvested to a yield no greater than 14 tonnes/hectare with the finished wine fermented to a minimum alcohol level of at least 10.5%.

In the Soave Superiore DOCG, Garganega must also account for a minimum of 70% of the wine, but Pinot bianco, Chardonnay and Trebbiano di Soave are allowed to fill up to 30% of the remaining blend, with Trebbiano toscano and other local white grape varieties (such as Friulano, Cortese, Riesling italico, Vespaiolo and Serprina) permitted up to 5% collectively. Grapes are harvested to a more restricted maximum yield of 10 tonnes/ha, while the finished DOCG wines must reach a minimum alcohol level of 11.5%.

While most Soave Superiore DOCG is produced from vineyards within the classico zone, the boundaries for the DOCG also extend to some of the hillside vineyards that are outside the classico zone. These wines are labeled as Soave Colli Scaligeri Superiore DOCG, a name referencing the hills around Verona that used to belong to the noble Scaligeri family, that were Lords of Verona for many years.

Additionally, there are also new regulations for planting under the DOCG system with new vineyards needing to be trained using Espalier systems with at least 4,000 vines per hectare. For those vines planted before 2002, the Espalier system, Pergola Inclinata and Pergoletta Veronese are allowed. Soave DOCG may be released on to the market only after 1 September of the year following the harvest, and after bottle aging of at least three months.

=== Soave superior vineyards ===
As early as 2000 a first mapping of the macro-zones within the Soave Classico zone was carried out, which led to an initial substantial identification of macro-areas whose wines were characterized by similar aromatic and organoleptic qualities. The more detailed research on the vineyards of Soave (2005–2008), carried out by the Consorzio, has been based on the numerous studies already effected, and in particular on that concerning zoning, files were prepared on the most significant wine companies in each of the various homogeneous zones that had been identified, listing the wineries, the labels and the characteristics of the wines.

=== Other wines ===
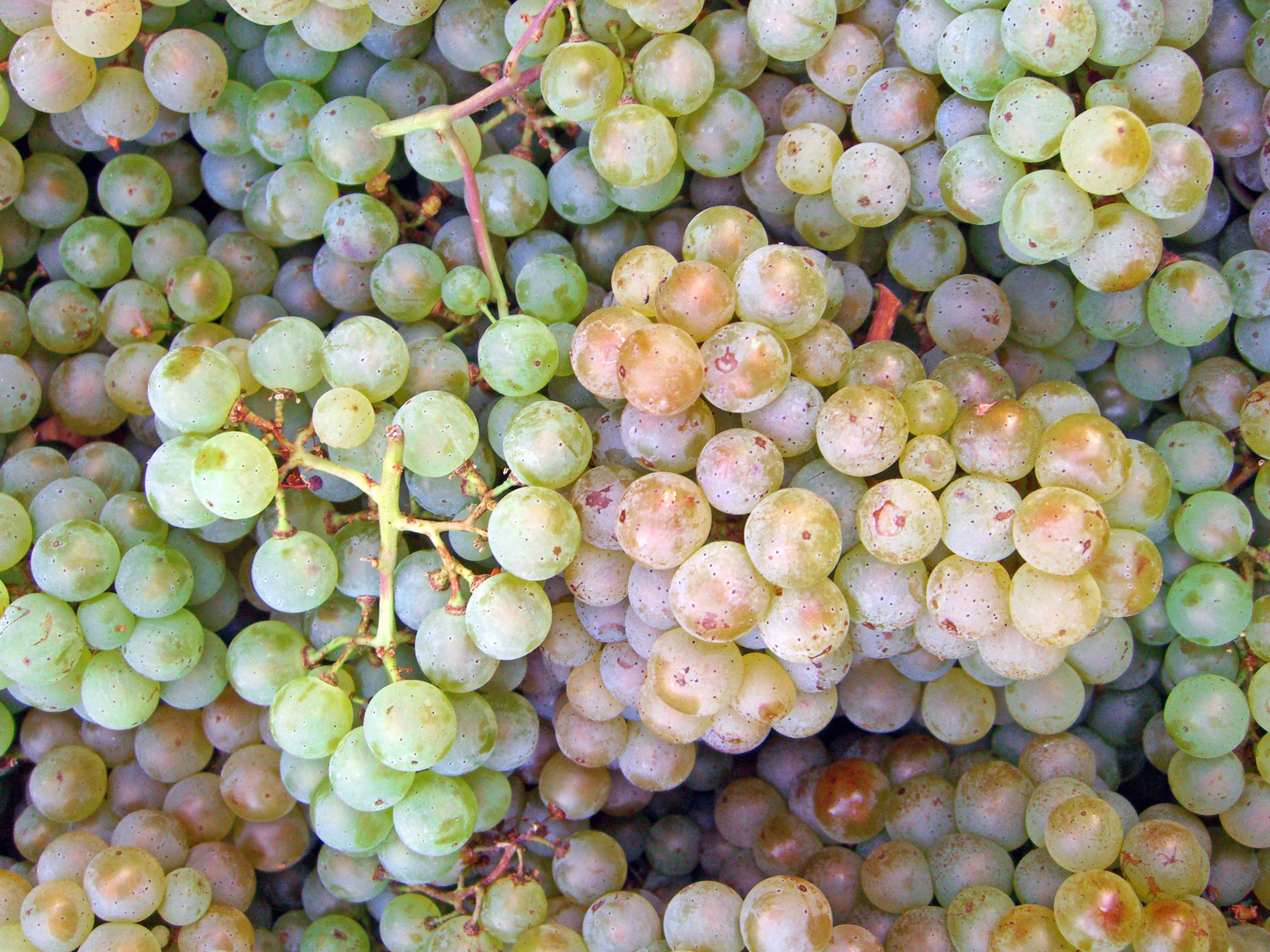
Pinot bianco, another permitted grape variety in Soave

The grape requirements for Recioto di Soave DOCG wines are the same as for basic Soave, but the grapes are dried using the appassimento process to accumulate more sugars and such need to be fermented to higher levels of alcohols. Reciotos are fermented to a minimum of 14% of alcohol, but still retain distinct sweetness due to the high concentrations of sugars that came from the grapes' desiccation on the vine.

Soave Superiore DOCG wines can also receive a Riserva designation, provided the wine is fermented to a minimum alcohol level of 12.5% and is aged a minimum of 24 months (with at least three of those months being in the bottle) before it is released on the market.

== Production and style ==
By the mid-1990s Soave was producing around 6 million cases annually, with more than 80% of that being produced by the region's local co-operative and sold in bulk to importers who release the wine under private labels. A sizable amount of this wine comes from the flat pianura land, outside the hilly classico region, in the heart of the Soave zone. Most of the more critically acclaimed Soave comes from the hillside vineyards in the Classico zone, though critics have argued that this designation does not mean as much since the DOC/G changes of the early 21st century.

For most of its history, Soave was produced in a medium-bodied style that was often compared to Chardonnay, except with a distinct bitter almond note. In the 1980s and 1990s, production styles shifted to producing more lighter and crisper styles that were closer to Pinot grigio than to Chardonnay. But at the turn of the 21st century, production trends were shifting towards a Soave that better reflected its own character and that of the Garganega grape.

Master of Wine Mary Ewing-Mulligan describes some of the Soave being produced today as light-bodied, straw-colored wine, that has fresh, fruity notes.

In 2009, Cantina di Soave co-operative, with 2,200 members, generated 48% of total Soave DOC production and 43% of Soave Classico. According to wine critic and author Kerin O'Keefe, Cantina di Soave, together with seven other co-ops, including the outstanding Cantina di Monteforte, have long been a defining element in the denomination. But over the past decade many growers have begun bottling their own wine, further fuelling a shift towards higher standards.

Tighter production regulations have escalated quality and some manufacturers are not leveraging the quality labelling like DOC and Superiore DOCG.
