= Micheloni =

Micheloni is an Italian surname, derived from the given name Michele. Notable people with the surname include:

- Egidio Micheloni (1913-?), Italian footballer
- Louis Antony Micheloni (1878–?), Uruguayan physician, fencer, and philatelist
- Pacifico Tiziano Micheloni (1881–1936), Italian bishop and missionary
