= Tregnago =

- Comune
- Comune di Tregnago
- Location within Italy Location within Veneto
- Coordinates: 45°31′N 11°10′E
- Country: Italy
- Region: Veneto
- Province: Verona (VR)
- Frazioni: Cogollo, Finetti, Marcemigo, Scorgnano

Government
  - Mayor: Simone Santellani

Area
  - Total: 37.4 km^{2} (14.4 sq mi)
- Elevation: 317 m (1,040 ft)

Population (31 May 2016)
  - Total: 4,945
  - Density: 132/km^{2} (342/sq mi)
- Demonym: Tregnaghesi
- Time zone: UTC+1 (CET)
  - Summer (DST): UTC+2 (CEST)
- Postal code: 37039
- Dialing code: 045
- Website: Official website

Tregnago is a comune (municipality) in the Province of Verona in the Italian region Veneto, located about 90 kilometres (56 mi) west of Venice and about 15 kilometres (9 mi) northeast of Verona.

Tregnago borders the following municipalities: Badia Calavena, Cazzano di Tramigna, Illasi, Mezzane di Sotto, San Giovanni Ilarione, San Mauro di Saline, Verona, and Vestenanova.

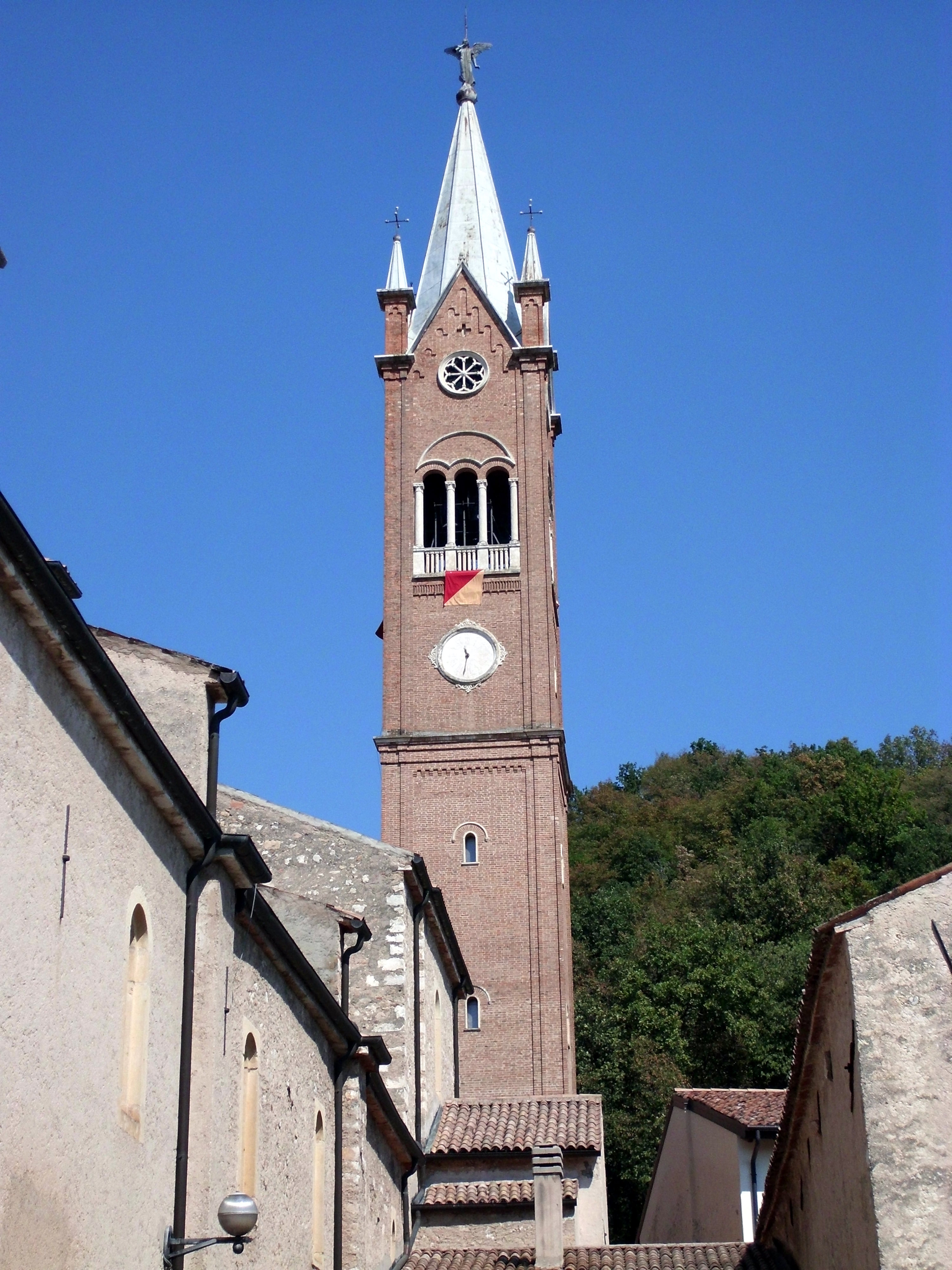
the Campanile of the parish church of S. Maria Assunta

== Twin towns ==
Tregnago is twinned with:

- Ollolai, Italy, since 2002
