= Monteforte d'Alpone =

- Comune
- Comune di Monteforte d'Alpone
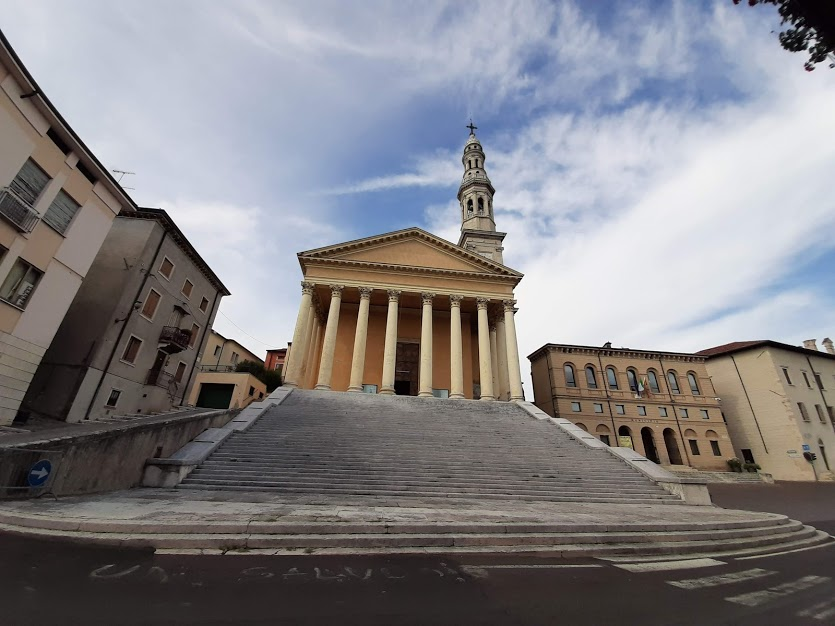

- Coat of arms

- Location within Italy Location within Veneto
- Coordinates: 45°25′N 11°17′E
- Country: Italy
- Region: Veneto
- Province: Verona (VR)
- Frazioni: Brognoligo, Costalunga, Sarmazza

Government
  - Mayor: Roberto Costa

Area
  - Total: 20.4 km^{2} (7.9 sq mi)
- Elevation: 38 m (125 ft)

Population (1 October 2010)
  - Total: 8,509
  - Density: 417/km^{2} (1,080/sq mi)
- Demonym: Montefortiani
- Time zone: UTC+1 (CET)
  - Summer (DST): UTC+2 (CEST)
- Postal code: 37032
- Dialing code: 045
- Website: Official website

Monteforte d'Alpone is a comune (municipality) in the Province of Verona in the Italian region Veneto, located about 80 kilometres (50 mi) west of Venice and about 25 kilometres (16 mi) east of Verona.

Monteforte d'Alpone borders the following municipalities: Gambellara, Montecchia di Crosara, San Bonifacio, and Soave. The economy is based on the production of wine.

It is famous for the production of Soave Classico wine, the Montefortiana running event, the great carnival, the historic grape festival and the tall bell tower, which has become the symbol of the town.

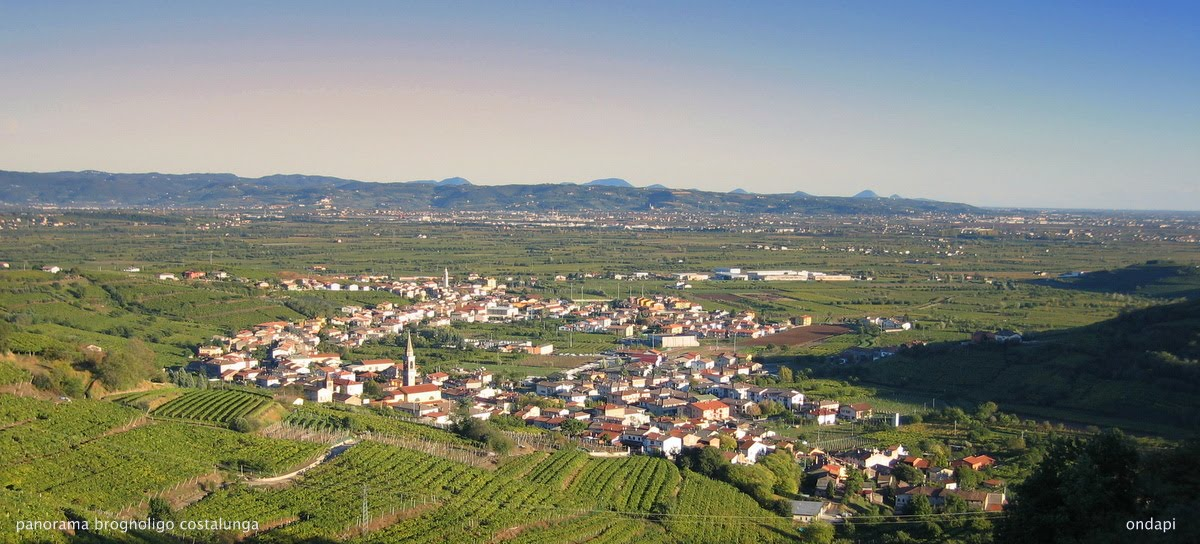
Vineyards in Brognoligo

== Main sights ==
- Church (Oratory) of St. Anthony (13th century)
- Church of the Capuchins (14th century)
- Church of Santa Croce (14th century)
- Bishops Palace (15th century), built by bishop of Verona Ermolao Barbaro on design by Michele da Caravaggio. It has a chapel with a fresco by Francesco Torbido (1534)
- Palazzo Durlo-Montanari (15th century)
