= San Martino Buon Albergo railway station =

Railway station in Italy

San Martino Buon Albergo
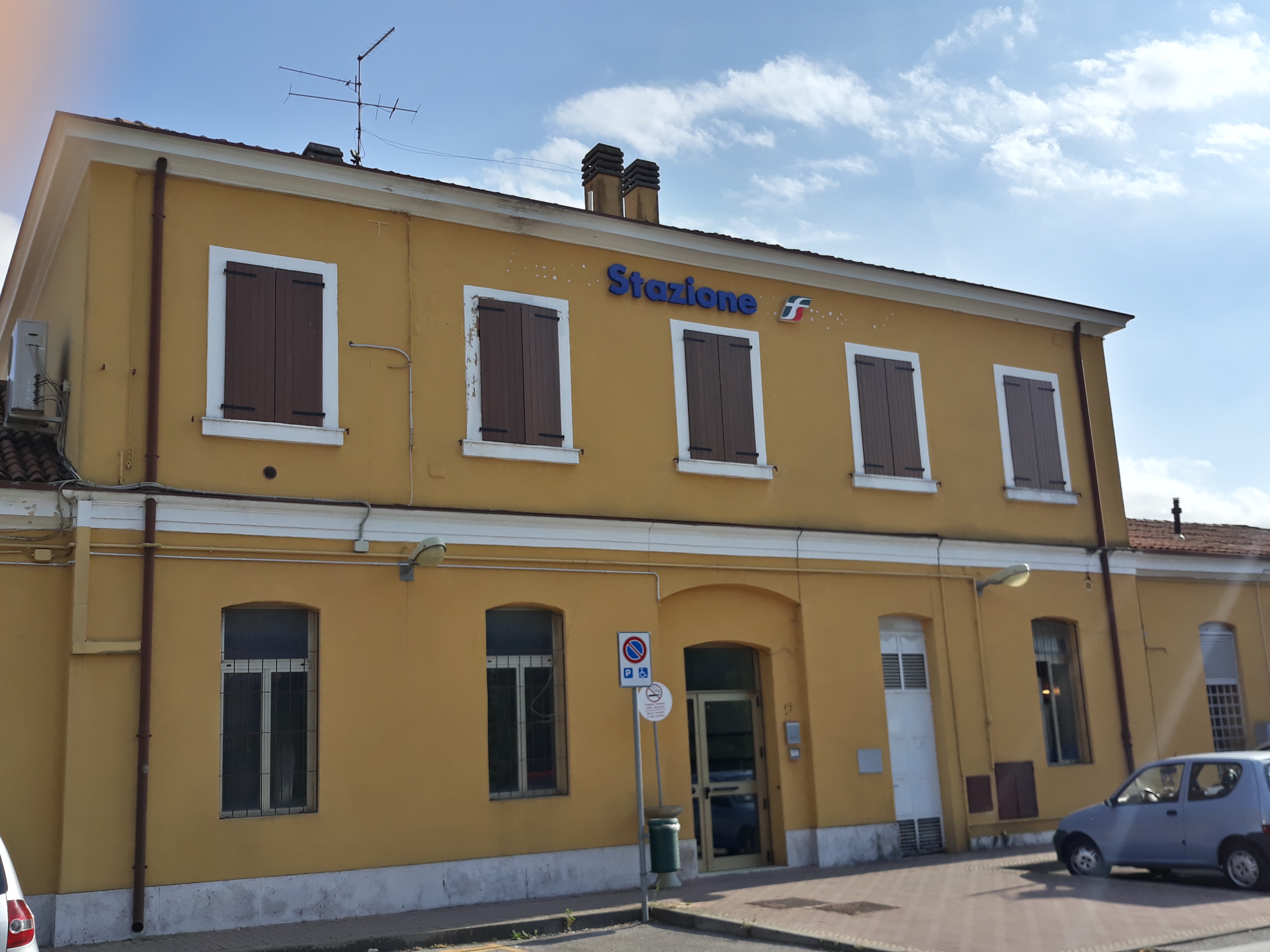
- San Martino Buon Albergo railway station

General information
- Location: Via Roma 1, San Martino Buon Albergo, Veneto; Italy
- Coordinates: 45°25′18″N 11°05′23″E
- Owner: Rete Ferroviaria Italiana
- Operator: Trenitalia
- Line: Milan–Venice railway
- Distance: 9.384 km (5.831 mi) from Verona Porta Nuova
- Platforms: 3
- Tracks: 3

Other information
- Classification: Bronze
Location
- Location within Veneto Location within Northern Italy Location within Italy

San Martino Buon Albergo (Italian: Stazione di San Martino Buon Albergo) is a railway station serving the town of San Martino Buon Albergo, in the region of Veneto, northern Italy. The station is located on the Milan–Venice railway. The train services are operated by Trenitalia.

== Train services ==
The station is served by the following services:

- Regional services (Treno regionale) Verona - Vicenza - Padua - Venice

== See also ==
- History of rail transport in Italy
- List of railway stations in Veneto
- Rail transport in Italy
- Railway stations in Italy
