= Montecchia di Crosara =

- Comune
- Comune di Montecchia di Crosara
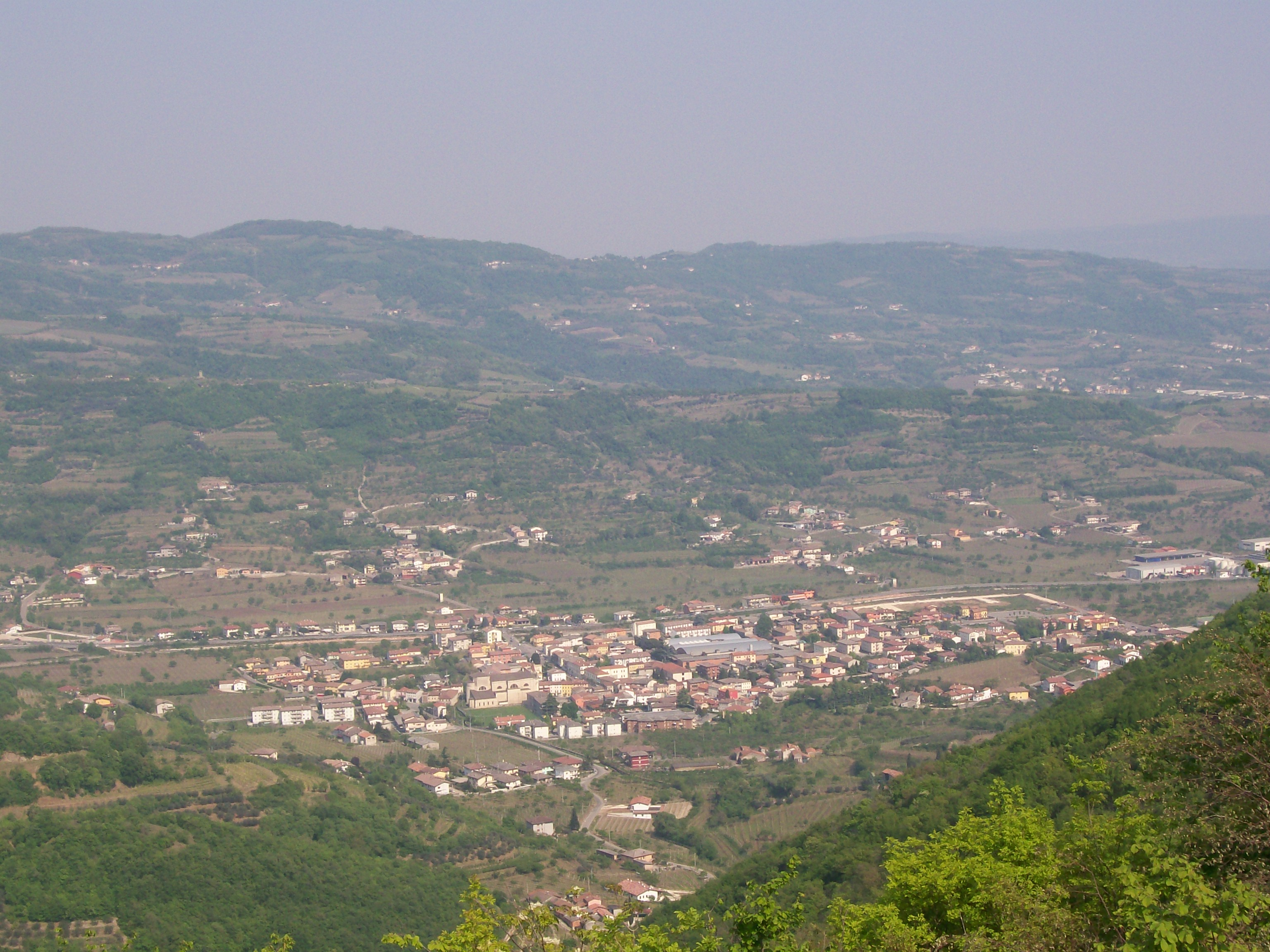

- Location within Italy Location within Veneto
- Coordinates: 45°29′N 11°15′E
- Country: Italy
- Region: Veneto
- Province: Verona (VR)

Government
  - Mayor: Edoardo Pallaro

Area
  - Total: 21.06 km^{2} (8.13 sq mi)
- Elevation: 87 m (285 ft)

Population (30 November 2017)
  - Total: 4,326
  - Density: 205.4/km^{2} (532.0/sq mi)
- Demonym: Montescledensi or Monscledensi
- Time zone: UTC+1 (CET)
  - Summer (DST): UTC+2 (CEST)
- Postal code: 37030
- Dialing code: 045
- Website: Official website

Montecchia di Crosara is a comune (municipality) in the Province of Verona in the Italian region of Veneto, located about 80 kilometres (50 miles) west of Venice and about 20 km (12 miles) northeast of Verona.

Montecchia di Crosara borders the following municipalities: Cazzano di Tramigna, Gambellara, Monteforte d'Alpone, Roncà, San Giovanni Ilarione, and Soave.

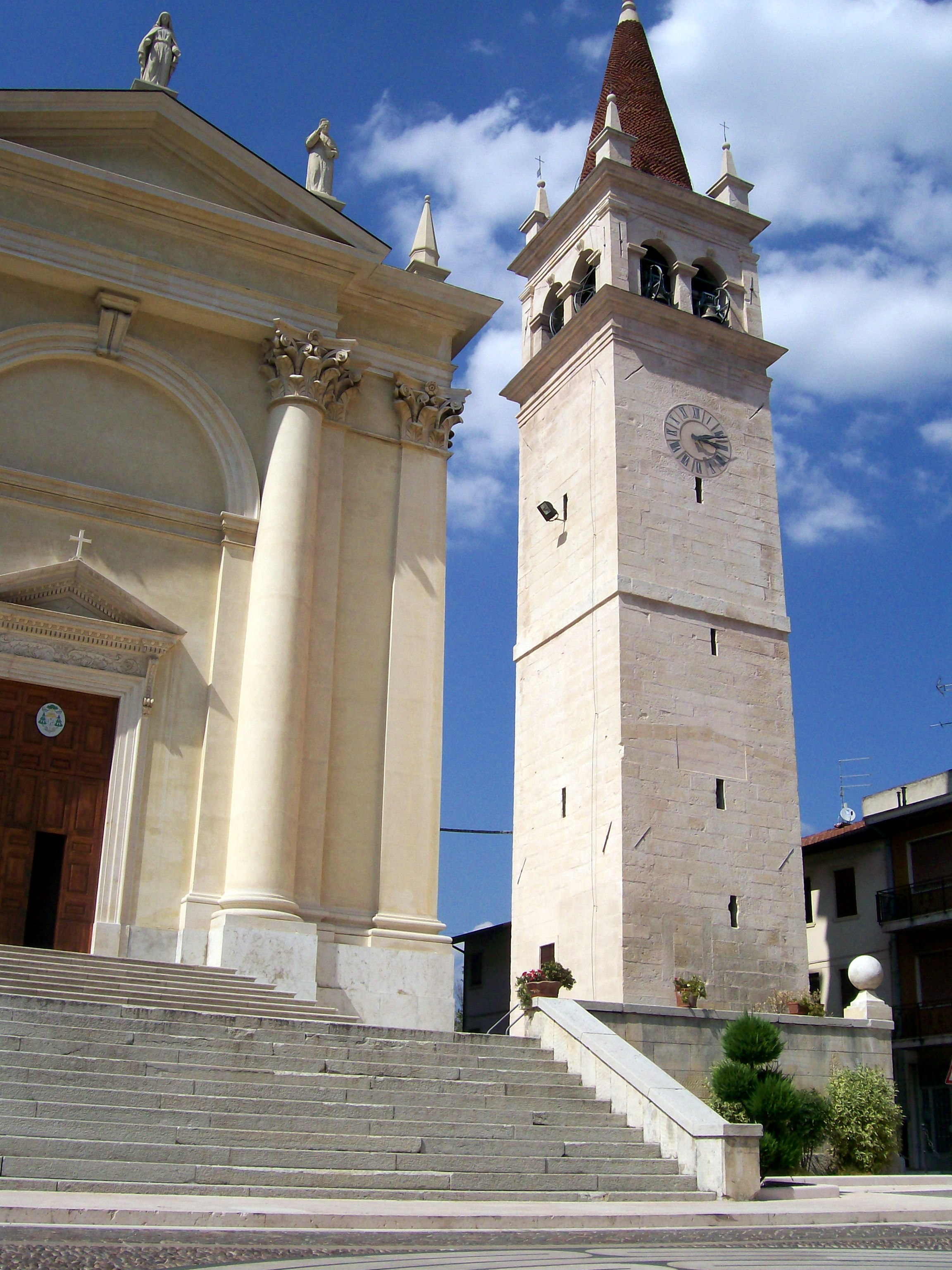
the Campanile of the Duomo of Santa Maria in Montecchia di Crosara

== Twin towns ==
Montecchia di Crosara is twinned with:

- Desulo, Italy
