= Caldiero railway station =

Railway station in Veneto, Italy

Caldiero
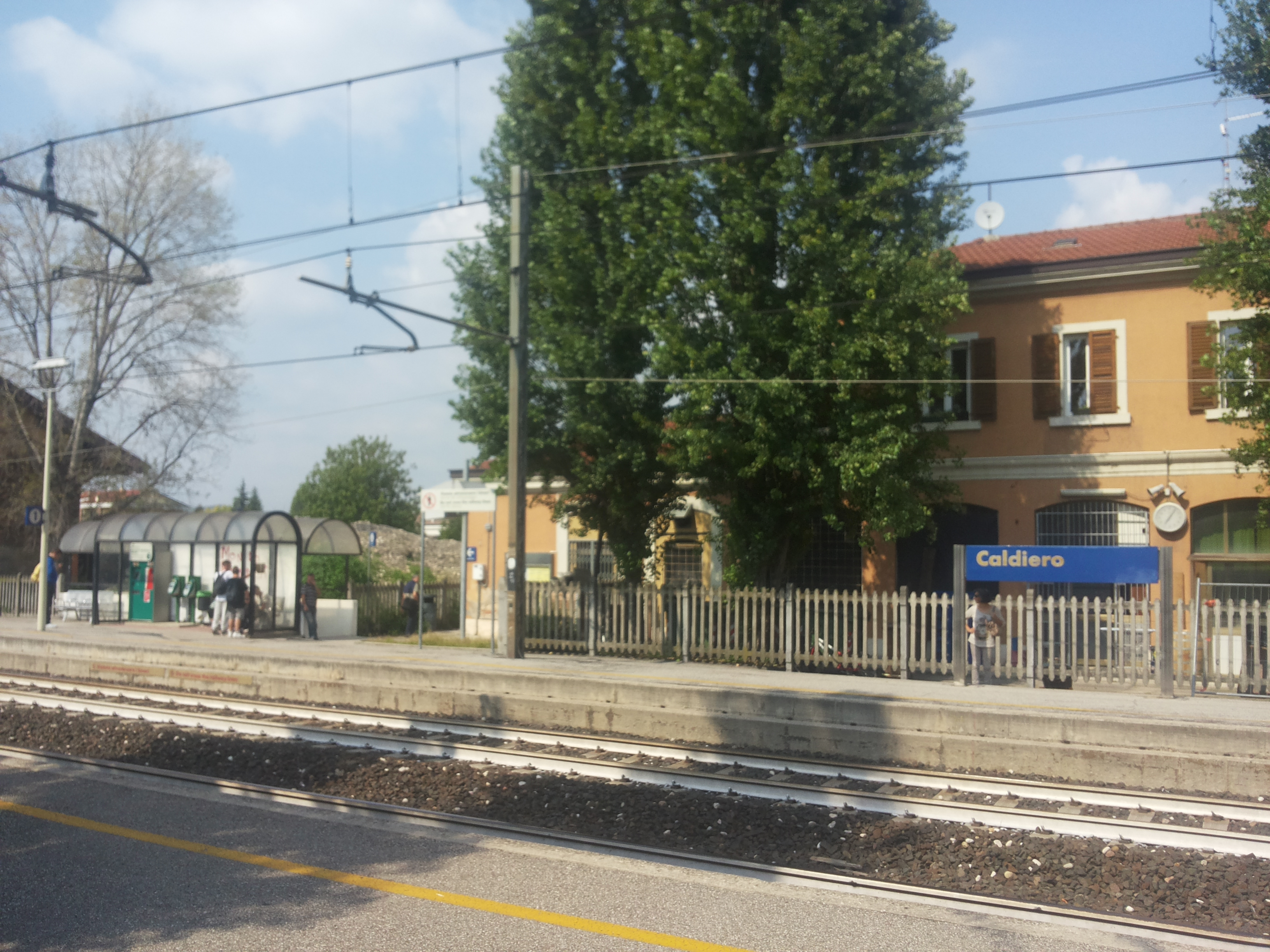
- Caldiero railway station

General information
- Location: Via Stazione 1, Caldiero, Veneto; Italy
- Coordinates: 45°24′50″N 11°10′12″E
- System: Railway Station
- Owner: Rete Ferroviaria Italiana
- Operator: Trenitalia
- Line: Milan–Venice railway
- Distance: 15.745 km (9.783 mi) from Verona Porta Nuova
- Platforms: 2
- Tracks: 2

Other information
- Classification: Silver

History
- Opened: 1886; 140 years ago
Location
- Location within Veneto Location within Northern Italy Location within Italy

Caldiero (Italian: Stazione di Caldiero) is a railway station serving the town of Caldiero, in the region of Veneto, northern Italy. The station is located on the Milan–Venice railway. The train services are operated by Trenitalia.

== Train services ==
The station is served by the following services:

- Regional services (Treno regionale) Verona - Vicenza - Padua - Venice

== See also ==
- History of rail transport in Italy
- List of railway stations in Veneto
- Rail transport in Italy
- Railway stations in Italy
