= Recioto di Soave DOCG =

Italian wine subregion

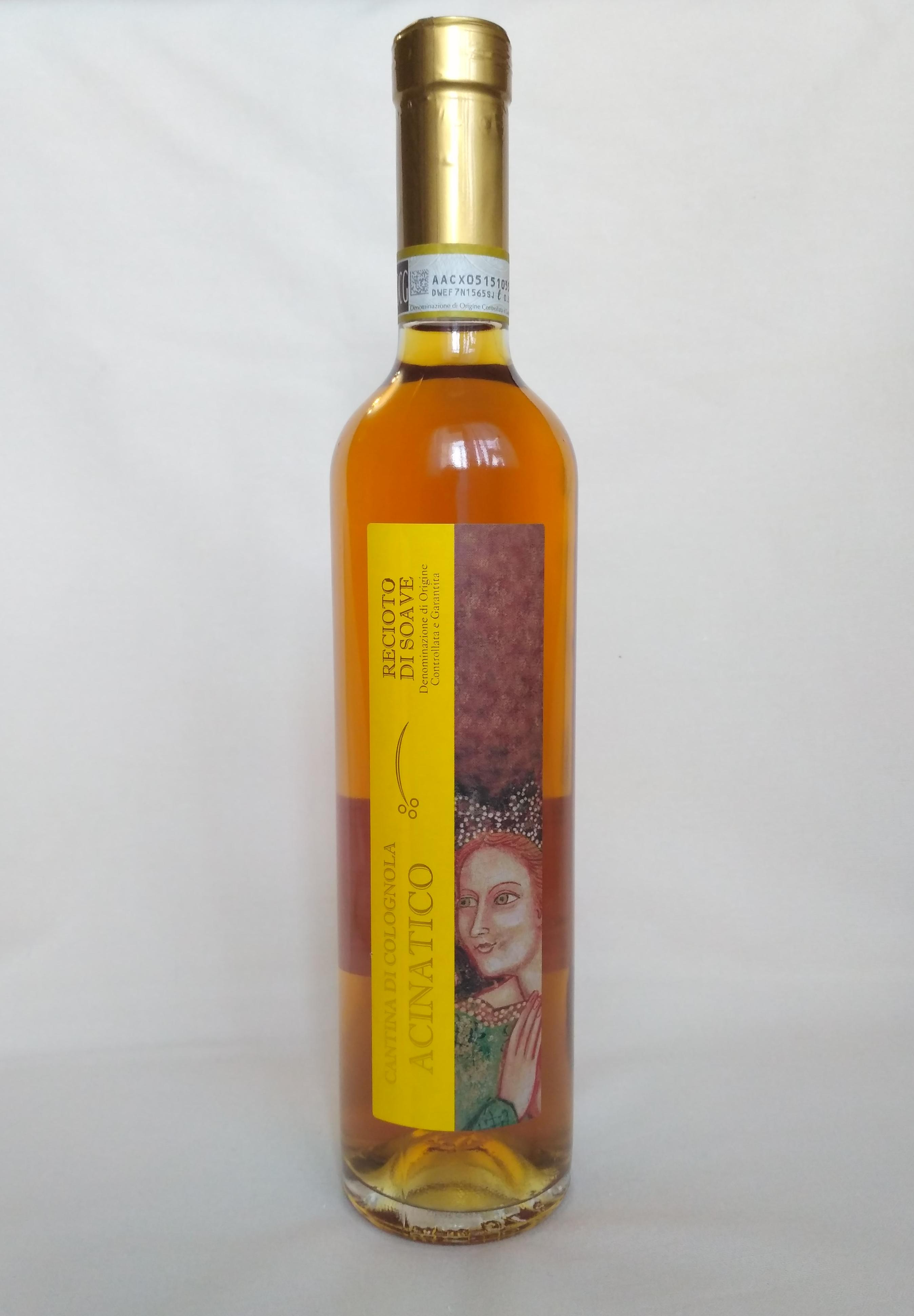
Recioto di Soave

Recioto di Soave DOCG is an Italian wine DOCG subregion of the Soave DOC. It was granted DOCG status in 1998. Recioto di Soave DOCG is made in the recioto method from grapes which have been dried out, traditionally on straw mats, for several weeks or months after harvest. A sweet wine, Recioto di Soave must be made of at least 70% Garganega grapes, and no more than 30% Trebbiano di Soave grapes allowed per DOCG regulations.

== See also ==
- List of Italian DOCG wines
- Straw wine
