= Colognola ai Colli =

- Comune
- Comune di Colognola ai Colli
- Vines in Colognola

- Location within Italy Location within Veneto
- Coordinates: 45°26′N 11°12′E
- Country: Italy
- Region: Veneto
- Province: Verona (VR)
- Frazioni: Monte con Villa (comune seat), San Zeno, Pieve, Stra e San Vittore

Government
  - Mayor: Gabriella Mucci (prefectural commissioner from 19-01-2026)

Area
  - Total: 20.8 km^{2} (8.0 sq mi)
- Elevation: 80 m (260 ft)

Population (30 september 2025)
  - Total: 8,688
  - Density: 418/km^{2} (1,080/sq mi)
- Demonym: Colognolesi
- Time zone: UTC+1 (CET)
  - Summer (DST): UTC+2 (CEST)
- Postal code: 37030
- Dialing code: 045
- Patron saint: St. Blaise
- Saint day: February 3
- Website: Official website

Colognola ai Colli is a comune (municipality) in the Province of Verona in the Italian region Veneto, located about 90 kilometres (56 mi) west of Venice and about 15 kilometres (9 mi) east of Verona.

Colognola ai Colli borders the following municipalities: Belfiore, Caldiero, Cazzano di Tramigna, Illasi, Lavagno, and Soave.

== Main sights ==
- Church of Santa Maria della Pieve (12th century). It was originally a temple devoted to the Roman god Mercury.

== Main products ==
- 'Wines: Valpolicella DOC, Amarone DOC and Recioto Soave DOC
- "Bisi" (Peas): this product makes Colognola ai Colli famous all over the province of Verona. Every year in May, there is a festival dedicated to Colognola's peas: "La Sagra dei Bisi". The typical dish is called 'Risi e bisi', risotto with peas.

== Sister city ==
- Răcăciuni (Romania)
