= Mezzane di Sotto =

- Comune
- Comune di Mezzane di Sotto
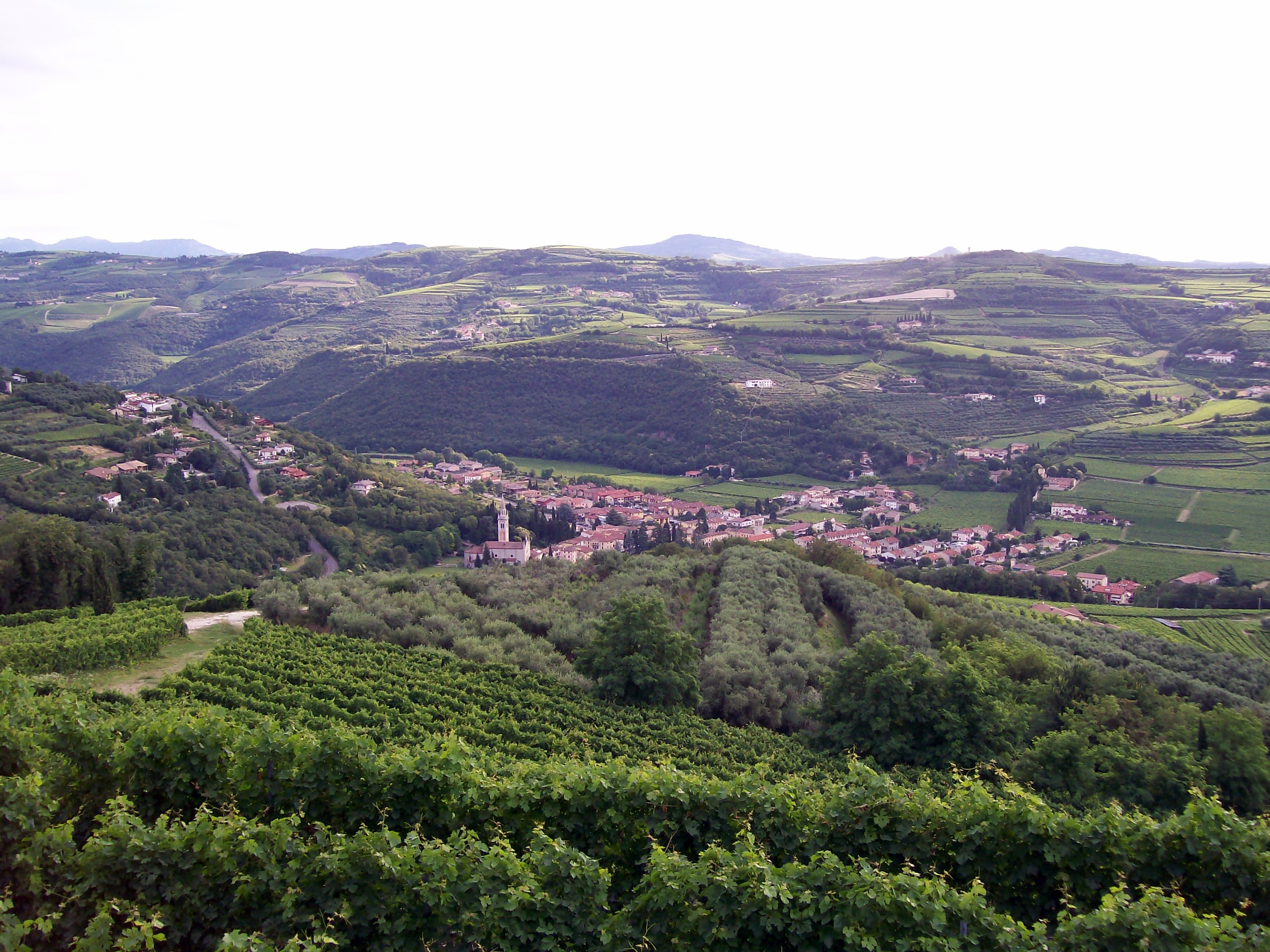

- Location within Italy Location within Veneto
- Coordinates: 45°29′N 11°8′E
- Country: Italy
- Region: Veneto
- Province: Province of Verona (VR)

Area
  - Total: 19.6 km^{2} (7.6 sq mi)
- Elevation: 122 m (400 ft)

Population (Dec. 2004)
  - Total: 1,949
  - Density: 99.4/km^{2} (258/sq mi)
- Demonym: Mezzanesi
- Time zone: UTC+1 (CET)
  - Summer (DST): UTC+2 (CEST)
- Postal code: 37030
- Dialing code: 045

Mezzane di Sotto is a comune (municipality) in the Province of Verona in the Italian region Veneto, located about 90 kilometres (56 mi) west of Venice and about 13 kilometres (8 mi) northeast of Verona. As of 31 December 2004, it had a population of 1,949 and an area of 19.6 square kilometres (7.6 mi^{2}).

Mezzane di Sotto borders the following municipalities: Illasi, Lavagno, San Martino Buon Albergo, Tregnago, and Verona.

== Demographic evolution ==
Historical population

Year	Pop.	±%
1861	?	—
1871	1,550	—
1881	1,745	+12.6%
1901	2,096	+20.1%
1911	2,304	+9.9%

Year	Pop.	±%
1921	2,373	+3.0%
1931	2,146	−9.6%
1936	2,099	−2.2%
1951	2,216	+5.6%
1961	1,870	−15.6%

Year	Pop.	±%
1971	1,471	−21.3%
1981	1,643	+11.7%
1991	1,789	+8.9%
2001	1,880	+5.1%

Source: Data from ISTAT
