= Caldiero =

- Comune
- Comune di Caldiero
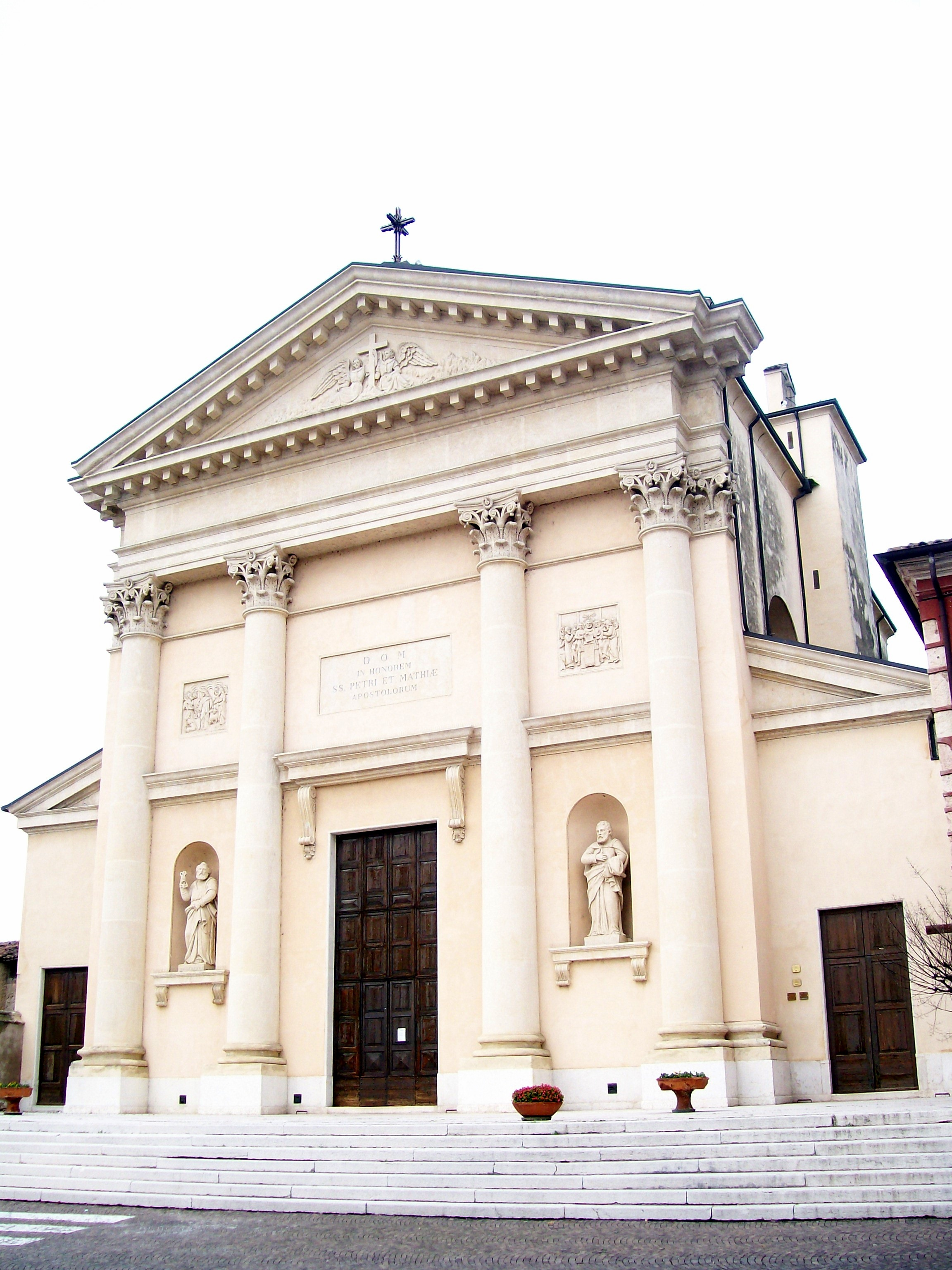
- Santi Pietro e Mattia parish church

- Location within Italy Location within Veneto
- Coordinates: 45°25′N 11°11′E
- Country: Italy
- Region: Veneto
- Province: Verona (VR)
- Frazioni: Caldierino

Government
  - Mayor: Marcello Lovato

Area
  - Total: 10.4 km^{2} (4.0 sq mi)
- Elevation: 44 m (144 ft)

Population (30 April 2017)
  - Total: 7,843
  - Density: 754/km^{2} (1,950/sq mi)
- Demonym: Caldieresi
- Time zone: UTC+1 (CET)
  - Summer (DST): UTC+2 (CEST)
- Postal code: 37042, frazioni 37040
- Dialing code: 045
- Saint day: February 28
- Website: Official website

Caldiero is a comune (municipality) in the Province of Verona in the Italian region Veneto, located about 90 kilometres (56 mi) west of Venice and about 15 kilometres (9 mi) east of Verona.

Caldiero borders the following municipalities: Belfiore, Colognola ai Colli, Lavagno, San Martino Buon Albergo, and Zevio.

== History ==
Caldiero was known in ancient Roman times as Calidarium, stemming from its thermal baths. Later it was held by the bishops of Verona who, in 1206, sold it to the commune. In 1233 Ezzelino III da Romano destroyed the castle. Later Caldiero was held by the Scaligers, the Nogarola counts, the Visconti and then by the Republic of Venice

Several battles were fought in the vicinity of Caldiero during the French Revolutionary Wars and Napoleonic Wars. These actions occurred on 12 November 1796, on 29–31 October 1805, on 29–30 April 1809, and on 15 November 1813. All the battles were fought between France and Austria. In 1796, the Austrians repelled a French attack; in 1805, both sides claimed victory; in 1809, the Austrians repulsed French attacks but retreated the next day; in 1813, the French drove back the Austrians.

== Main sights ==
- Baths of Juno, still preserving ancient pools of Roman origins.

== Transport ==
- Caldiero railway station
