= Egidio Micheloni =

Italian footballer (born 1913)

Personal information
- Date of birth: 27 September 1913
- Place of birth: San Martino Buon Albergo, Kingdom of Italy
- Height: 1.75 m (5 ft 9 in)
- Position: Goalkeeper

Senior career*
Years	Team	Apps	(Gls)
1934–1939	Verona	77	(0)
1939–1941	Milano	20	(0)
1941–1942	Juventus	10	(0)
1942–1943	Verona	24	(0)
- * Club domestic league appearances and goals

Egidio Micheloni (born 27 September 1913 – 12 August 1992) was an Italian professional footballer who played as a goalkeeper.

== Honours ==
Juventus

- Coppa Italia winner: 1941–42
