= Lavagno =

- Comune
- Comune di Lavagno
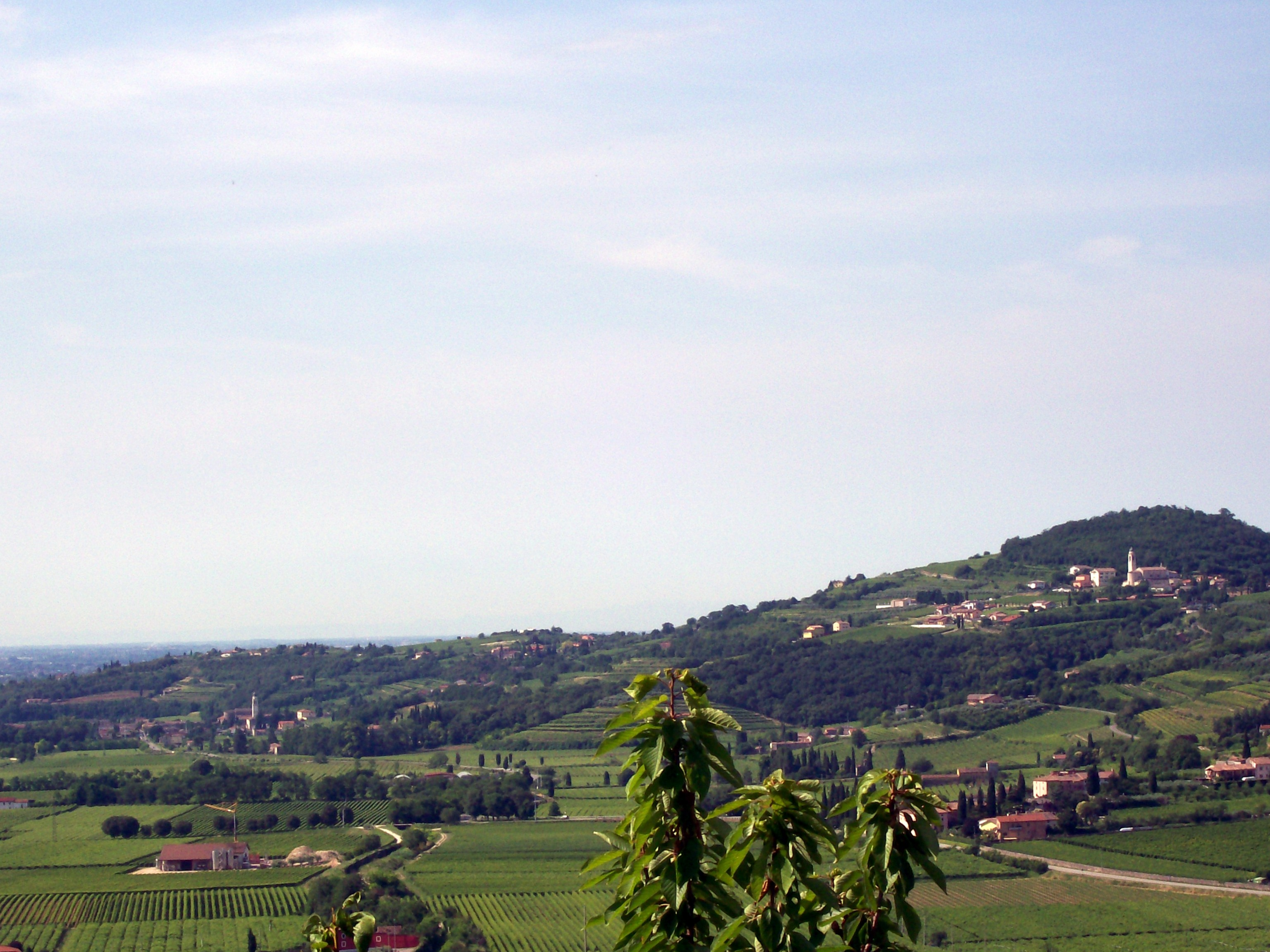

- Location within Italy Location within Veneto
- Coordinates: 45°26′N 11°8′E
- Country: Italy
- Region: Veneto
- Province: Verona (VR)
- Frazioni: San Briccio, San Pietro (municipal seat), Vago, Turano

Government
  - Mayor: Simone Albi

Area
  - Total: 14.6 km^{2} (5.6 sq mi)
- Elevation: 67 m (220 ft)

Population (31 August 2017)
  - Total: 8,401
  - Density: 575/km^{2} (1,490/sq mi)
- Demonym: Lavagnesi
- Time zone: UTC+1 (CET)
  - Summer (DST): UTC+2 (CEST)
- Postal code: 37030
- Dialing code: 045
- Website: Official website

Lavagno is a comune (municipality) in the Province of Verona in the Italian region Veneto, located about 90 kilometres (56 mi) west of Venice and about 12 kilometres (7 mi) east of Verona.

The municipality of Lavagno is formed by the frazioni (subdivisions, mainly villages and hamlets) San Briccio, San Pietro (municipal seat), Turano and Vago.

Lavagno borders the following municipalities: Caldiero, Colognola ai Colli, Illasi, Mezzane di Sotto, and San Martino Buon Albergo.
