= San Martino Buon Albergo =

San Martino Buon Albergo San Martin Bon Albergo
- Comune
- Comune di San Martino Buon Albergo
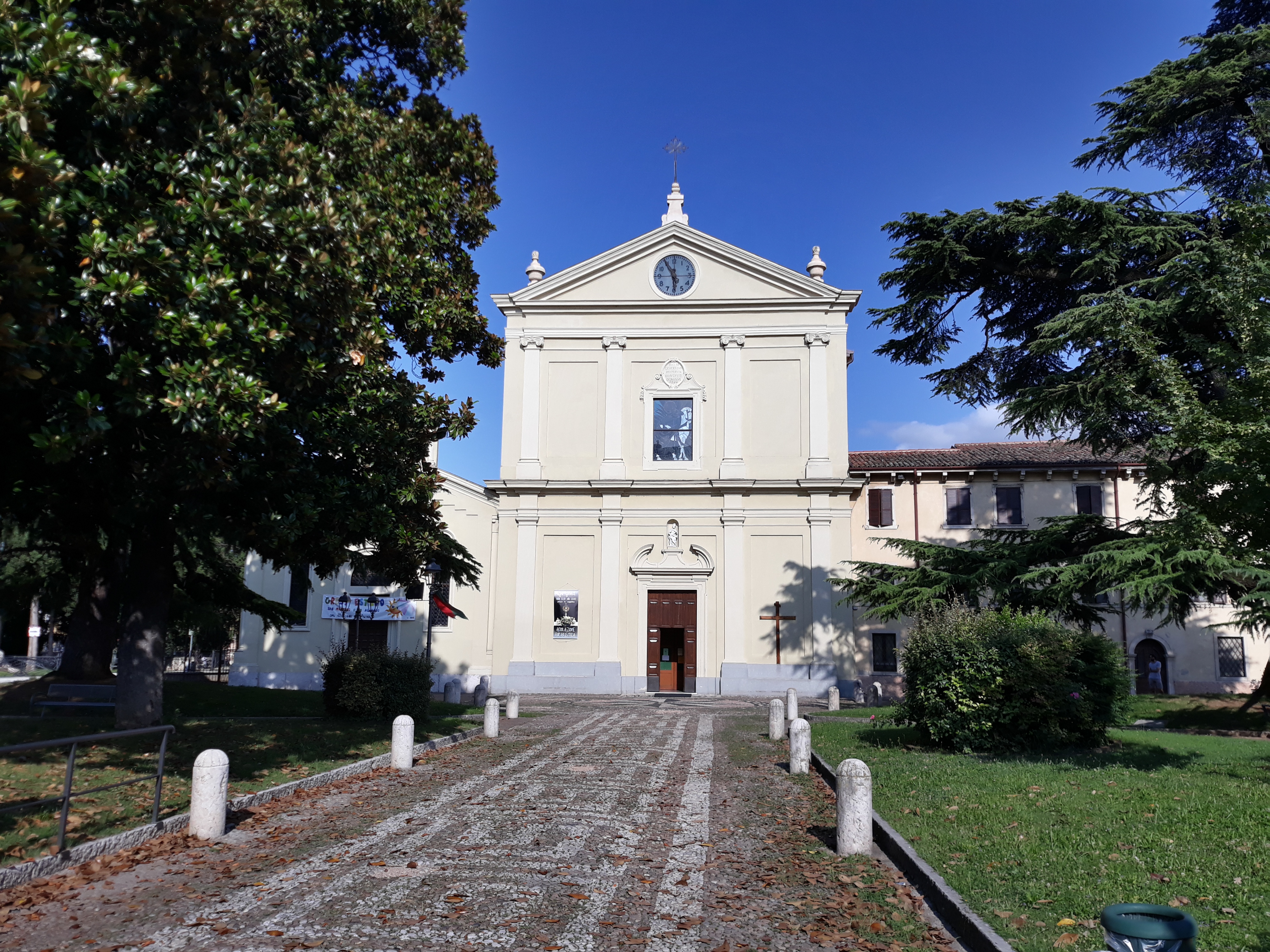
- Church of Saint Martin

- Coat of arms

- Location within Italy Location within Veneto
- Coordinates: 45°25′N 11°6′E
- Country: Italy
- Region: Veneto
- Province: Verona (VR)

Government
  - Mayor: Valerio Avesan

Area
  - Total: 35.3 km^{2} (13.6 sq mi)
- Elevation: 45 m (148 ft)

Population (1 January 2010)
  - Total: 14,017
  - Density: 397/km^{2} (1,030/sq mi)
- Demonym: Sanmartinesi
- Time zone: UTC+1 (CET)
  - Summer (DST): UTC+2 (CEST)
- Postal code: 37036
- Dialing code: 045
- Patron saint: San Martino
- Saint day: November 11th
- Website: Official website

San Martino Buon Albergo (Venetian: San Martin Bon Albergo) is a comune (municipality) in the Province of Verona in the Italian region Veneto, located about 100 kilometres (62 miles) west of Venice and about 9 km (6 mi) east of Verona.

San Martino Buon Albergo borders the following municipalities: Caldiero, Lavagno, Mezzane di Sotto, San Giovanni Lupatoto, Verona, and Zevio.

== Transport ==
- San Martino Buon Albergo railway station

== Twin towns ==
- Voitsberg, Austria

== Notable people ==
- Egidio Micheloni, footballer
