= Illasi =

- Comune
- Comune di Illasi
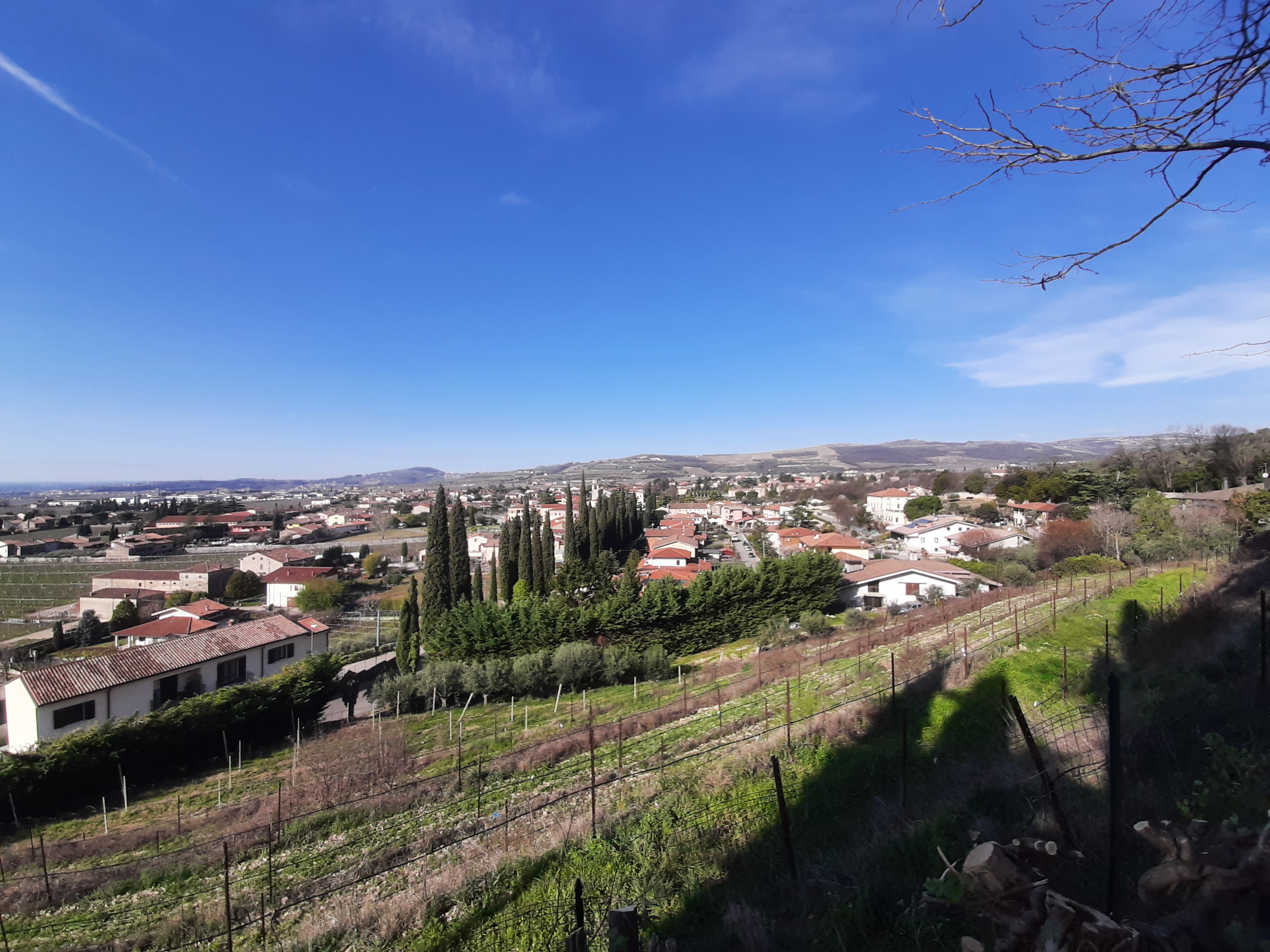

- Location within Italy Location within Veneto
- Coordinates: 45°28′N 11°11′E
- Country: Italy
- Region: Veneto
- Province: Province of Verona (VR)
- Frazioni: Cellore, Donzellino

Area
  - Total: 25.0 km^{2} (9.7 sq mi)
- Elevation: 157 m (515 ft)

Population (Dec. 2004)
  - Total: 5,112
  - Density: 204/km^{2} (530/sq mi)
- Demonym: Illasiani
- Time zone: UTC+1 (CET)
  - Summer (DST): UTC+2 (CEST)
- Postal code: 37031, 37030 frazioni
- Dialing code: 045
- Patron saint: Bartholomew day               = August 24th  mayor             = Giuseppe Vezzari website =

Illasi is a comune (municipality) in the Province of Verona in the Italian region Veneto, about 90 kilometres (56 mi) west of Venice and about 15 kilometres (9 mi) east of Verona. As of 31 December 2004, it had a population of 5,112 and an area of 25.0 square kilometres (9.7 mi^{2}).

The municipality of Illasi contains the frazioni (subdivisions, mainly villages and hamlets) Cellore and Donzellino.

Illasi borders the following municipalities: Cazzano di Tramigna, Colognola ai Colli, Lavagno, Mezzane di Sotto, and Tregnago.

== History ==
The area was inhabited since the Bronze Age: during 2007 a burial ground with 63 tombs, dated 2nd millennium BC, was discovered near the village of Arano. Several remains were found of the Roman presence in the area: the stones, now mainly in the Museo Maffeiano in Verona, show a population composed of retired veterans, to whom, after service, the Roman Emperors assigned pieces of land to be cultivated (mainly cereals, but also vineyards and olive trees). The name Illasi is supposed to be after the name "Gelasius", probably a Roman centurion. Some scholars supposed a simple derivation from "Latii", that means the Latini, people from Lazio. In the late Roman period (4th century) one of the first Christian oratories outside the city of Verona was established in the hamlet of Saint Justina(S.Giustina). It became a center of evangelization, sending missionaries to all the eastern province of Verona. The early Middleage belltower of the religious complex can still be seen. After the fall of Rome (476), the Lombards conquered most of Italy: some remains (jewelry, weapons) were found in the village of Cellore. In the Middle Age the church of Illasi was granted a status of Pieve, a religious center controlling the area and collecting taxes. The castle, that today dominates the village and surroundings, was built in the 12th century. The structure, composed by a fortified palace and a single tower, surrounded by a wall, is extremely peculiar and almost unique in Europe. It is still unclear which lord built it. It already existed when the tyrant Ezzelino da Romano used it as a base for his wars. Then it became one of the main strongholds during the domination of the Della Scala family, lords of Verona. It was besieged several times, and at the end of the 14th century it was burned by the troops of the Da Carrara family, lords of Padua, just before it was conquered, like all the province of Verona, by the Republic of Venice. In the 15th century its military function was impaired by the use of guns: after an easy conquest by Milanese troops, the Venetians decided to dismiss it. They gave it to the Pompei family, one of the few noble families of Verona always faithful to Venice and without sympathies for the rival Austrian Empire. The Pompei shortly used the castle as a residence, before moving to the magnificent villas they built, down the hill, in the centre of the village (now Villa Sagramoso Perez-Pompei and Villa Pompei-Carlotti). The Pompei received the municipality of Illasi like a feud, and exercised civil jurisdiction until the arrival of Napoleone Bonaparte who ended the Republic of Venice (1797).

== Demographic evolution ==
Historical population

Year	Pop.	±%
1861	?	—
1871	2,699	—
1881	3,121	+15.6%
1901	3,851	+23.4%
1911	3,999	+3.8%

Year	Pop.	±%
1921	4,031	+0.8%
1931	3,790	−6.0%
1936	3,953	+4.3%
1951	4,044	+2.3%
1961	3,545	−12.3%

Year	Pop.	±%
1971	3,476	−1.9%
1981	3,944	+13.5%
1991	4,527	+14.8%
2001	4,884	+7.9%

Source: Data from ISTAT

== Twin towns ==
Illasi is twinned with:

- Wörth an der Isar, Germany, since 2001

== Notable people ==
- Luigi Maria Verzé (1920–2011), priest
