= Cazzano di Tramigna =

- Comune
- Comune di Cazzano di Tramigna
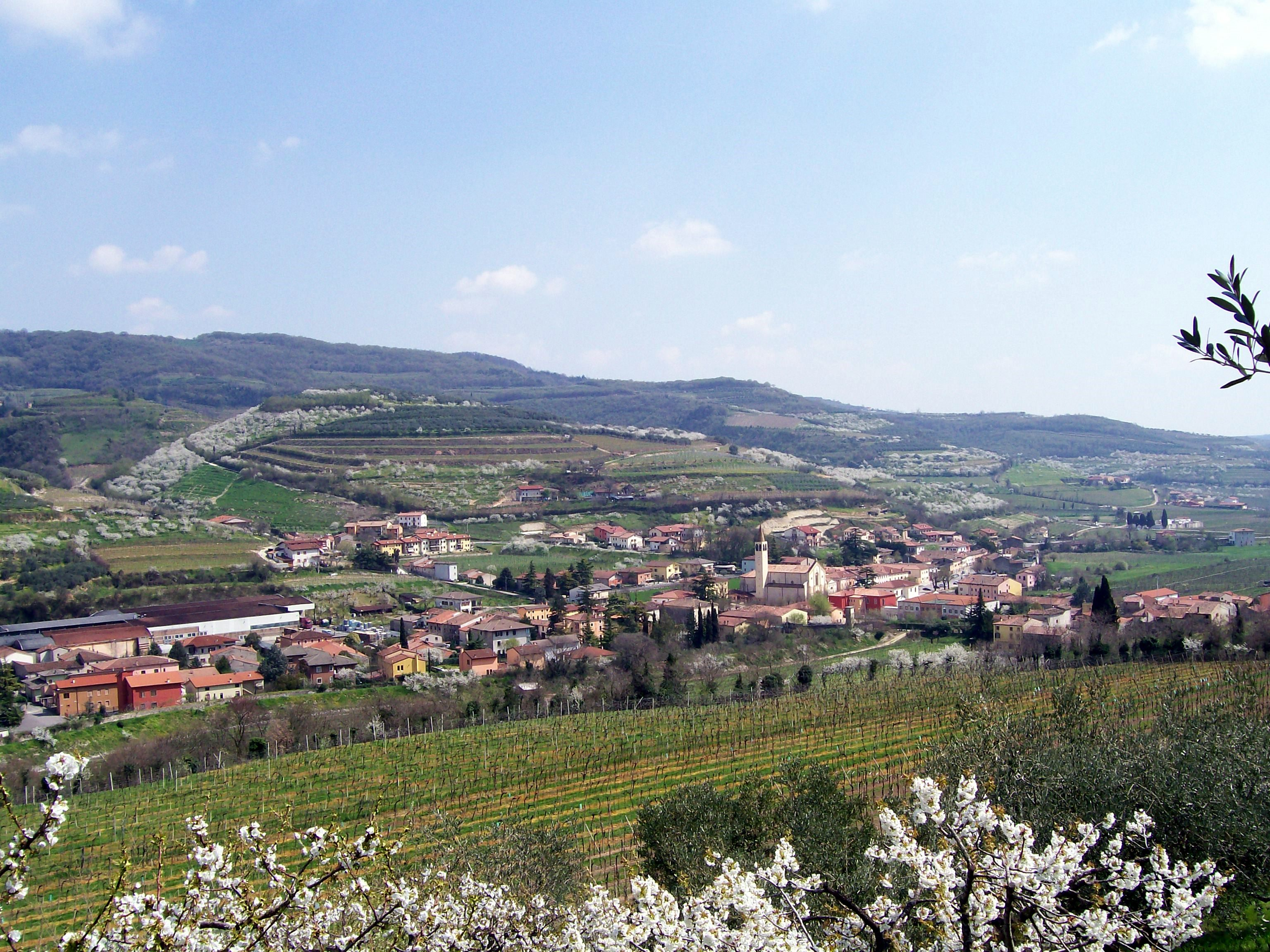

- Location within Italy Location within Veneto
- Coordinates: 45°29′N 11°12′E
- Country: Italy
- Region: Veneto
- Province: Verona (VR)
- Frazioni: Campiano, Costeggiola

Government
  - Mayor: Maria Luisa Guadin

Area
  - Total: 12.27 km^{2} (4.74 sq mi)
- Elevation: 100 m (330 ft)

Population (13 December 2017)
  - Total: 1,512
  - Density: 123.2/km^{2} (319.2/sq mi)
- Demonym: Cazzanesi
- Time zone: UTC+1 (CET)
  - Summer (DST): UTC+2 (CEST)
- Postal code: 37030
- Dialing code: 045
- Website: Official website

Cazzano di Tramigna is a comune (municipality) in the Province of Verona in the Italian region Veneto, located about 90 kilometres (56 mi) west of Venice and about 20 kilometres (12 mi) northeast of Verona.

Cazzano di Tramigna borders the following municipalities: Colognola ai Colli, Illasi, Montecchia di Crosara, San Giovanni Ilarione, Soave, and Tregnago.

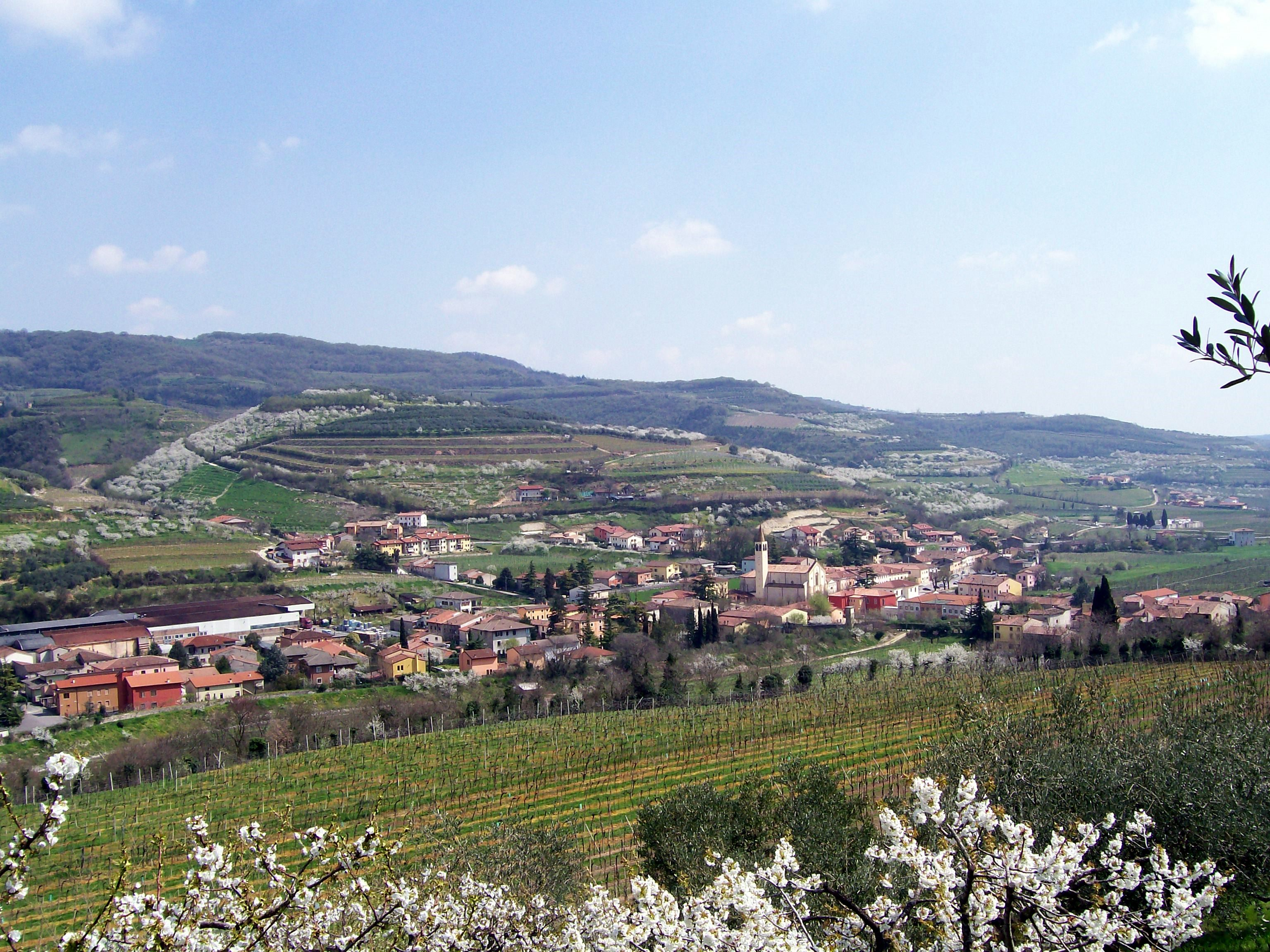
Cazzano di tramigna in spring
