= Gambellara =

- Comune
- Comune di Gambellara
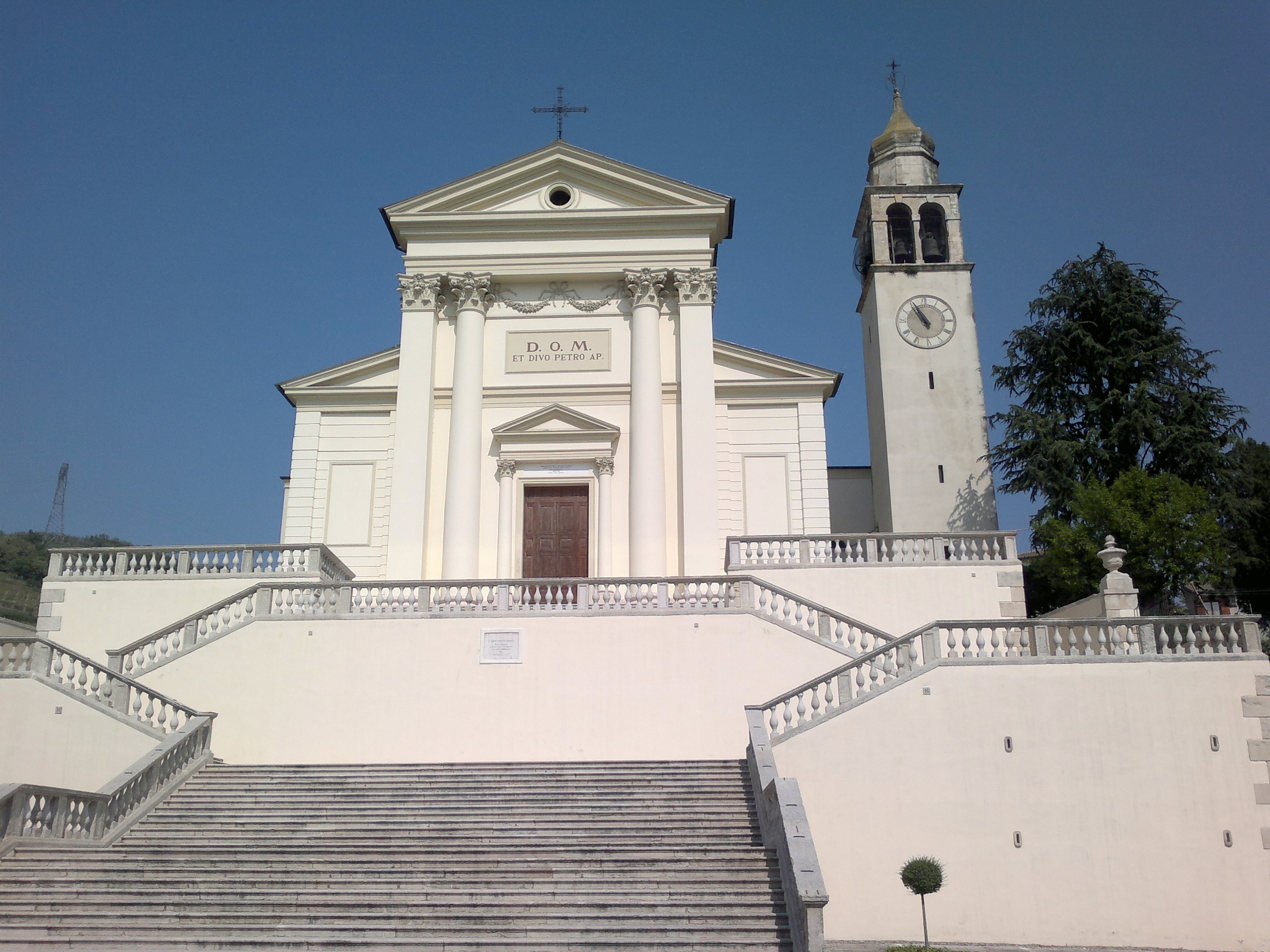
- Church of St. Peter the Apostle.

- Location within Italy Location within Veneto
- Coordinates: 45°28′N 11°20′E
- Country: Italy
- Region: Veneto
- Province: Vicenza (VI)
- Frazioni: Sarmazza, Sorio, Torri di Confine

Government
  - Mayor: Michela Doro

Area
  - Total: 12 km^{2} (4.6 sq mi)
- Elevation: 70 m (230 ft)

Population (31 December 2014)
  - Total: 3,419
  - Density: 280/km^{2} (740/sq mi)
- Demonym: Gambellaresi
- Time zone: UTC+1 (CET)
  - Summer (DST): UTC+2 (CEST)
- Postal code: 36053
- Dialing code: 0444
- ISTAT code: 024043
- Patron saint: San Marco
- Website: Official website

Gambellara is a town and comune in the province of Vicenza, Veneto, Italy. It is northwest of European route E70.

Gambellara is known for its wine production. The area has one DOC classified wine, Gambellara classico and Recioto de Gambellara which was in 2009 upgraded from DOC-level to the highest Italian appellation DOCG. The Recioto is also often made in a sparkling, vat-fermented, version.

The vineyards are dominated by Garganega grapes trained in the traditional "Veronese pergola" system, though a few producers have recently changed to more modern training systems. Most wineyards are cultivated on steep hills with terraces.

The largest producer in Gambellara is the family-owned Zonin.

== Twin towns ==
Gambellara is twinned with:

- Butera, Italy

== Sources ==
- (Google Maps)
