= National Archaeological Museum of Altino =

- Museo archeologico nazionale di Altino (MANA)
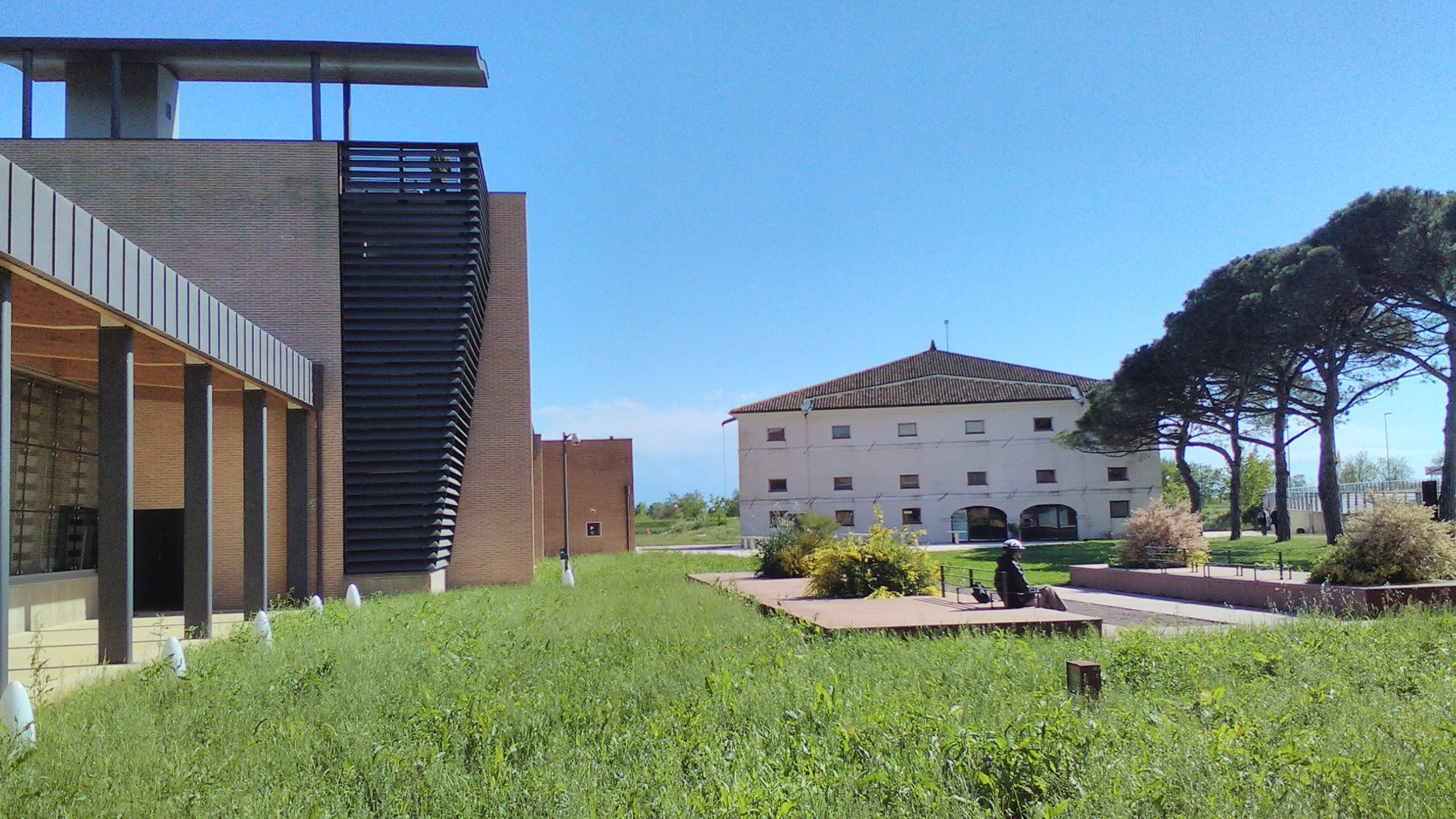
- The new museum
- Established: 29 May 1960 -->
- Location: Quarto d'Altino
- Coordinates: 45.5407°N 12.3981°E
- Type: Archaeology museum
- Collection size: 40,000 items
- Visitors: 10,708 (2015)
- Founder: count Jacopo Marcello
- Director: Mariolina Gamba
- Architects: Ferdinando Forlati (old museum); Stefano Filippi (new museum)
- Owner: Ministry of Cultural Heritage and Activities of Italy
- Parking: On site (no charge)

The National Archaeological Museum of Altino (in italian: Museo archeologico nazionale di Altino, MANA) is an archaeology museum next to the archaeological site of Altinum. It is located in the frazione Altino of the municipality of Quarto d'Altino, in the Metropolitan City of Venice.

The museum, which preserves the most representative archaeological finds of Altinum, and the nearby archaeological site of Altino are included in the UNESCO World Heritage site "Venice and its lagoon".

== History ==
=== Old museum ===
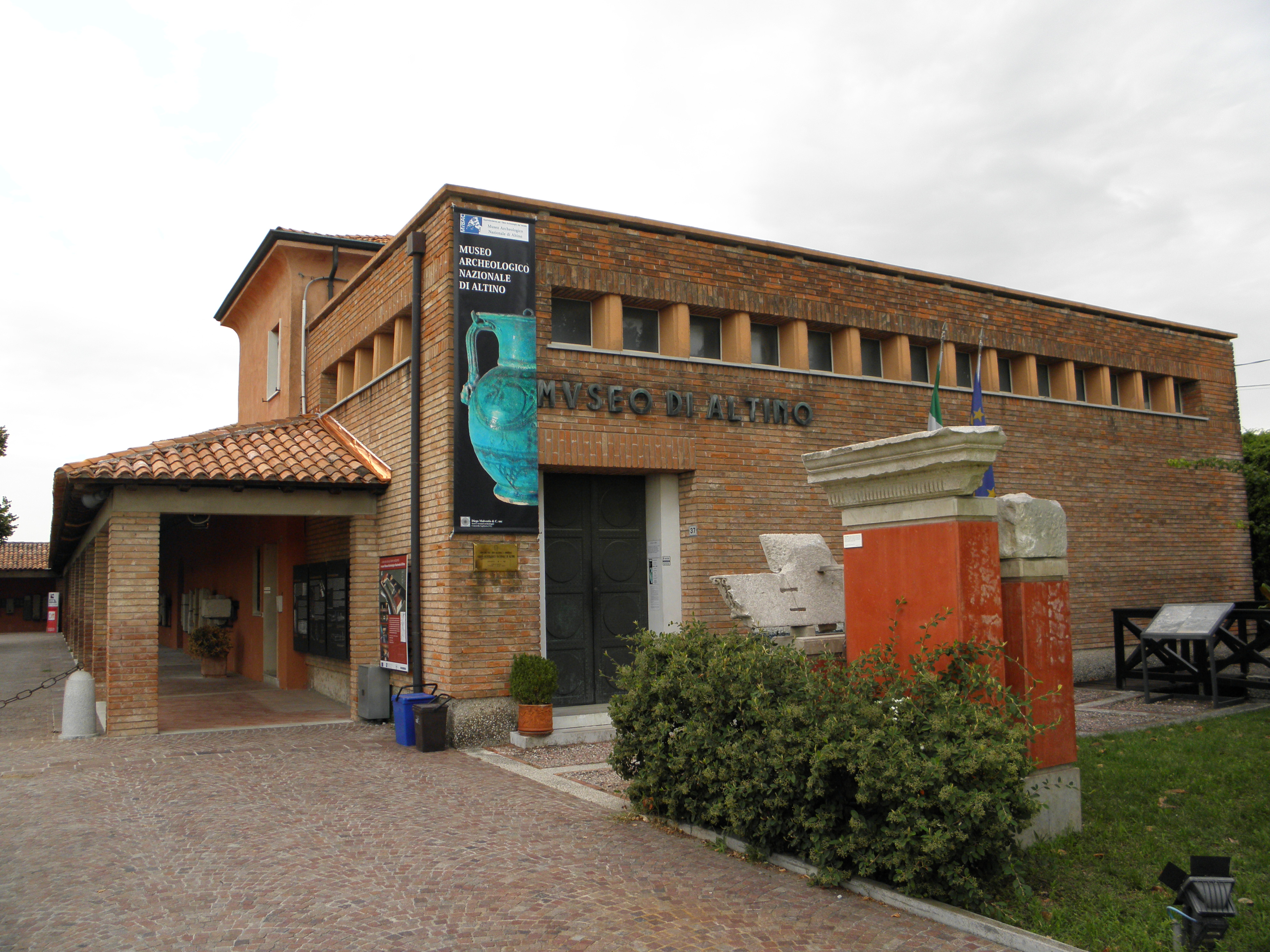
The old seat of the Museum, now used as a warehouse for archaeological finds (AltinoLab)

At the end of the 1950s the construction of the museum began, based on a project by the architect Ferdinando Forlati, to collect the finds found at the end of the 19th century during agricultural work and during the first excavations of 1936-1937. Initially the objects were kept at Villa Reali in Dosson (Treviso).

The small museum, built by the Superintendence and Count Jacopo Marcello, was inaugurated on 29 May 1960 and consisted of two rooms, one of which was used as an exhibition space divided into two rooms, the other as a warehouse of archaeological finds; in the outer porch are exposed some tombstones. Until then, the number and above all the importance of the excavations in the area in question, under the management of the Archaeological Superintendence, had been extremely low. Since 1966, however, numerous excavations have been carried out in the area of Via Annia, which brought to light more than 2000 finds of tombs and burial places. At the time of its inauguration the Museum had less than a thousand objects, while today there are more than 40,000 artifacts from the surrounding archaeological areas of Altino, in the middle of which is the museum.

Some parts of the collection, such as inscriptions, funerary stelae or glass finds, single archaeological studies have been carried out and specialised exhibitions are being organised.

First director of the museum was the archaeologist Michele Tombolani (1943-1989), replaced in 1987 by the archaeologist Margherita Tirelli. From 2015 the new director of the museum is the archaeologist Mariolina Gamba.

=== New museum ===
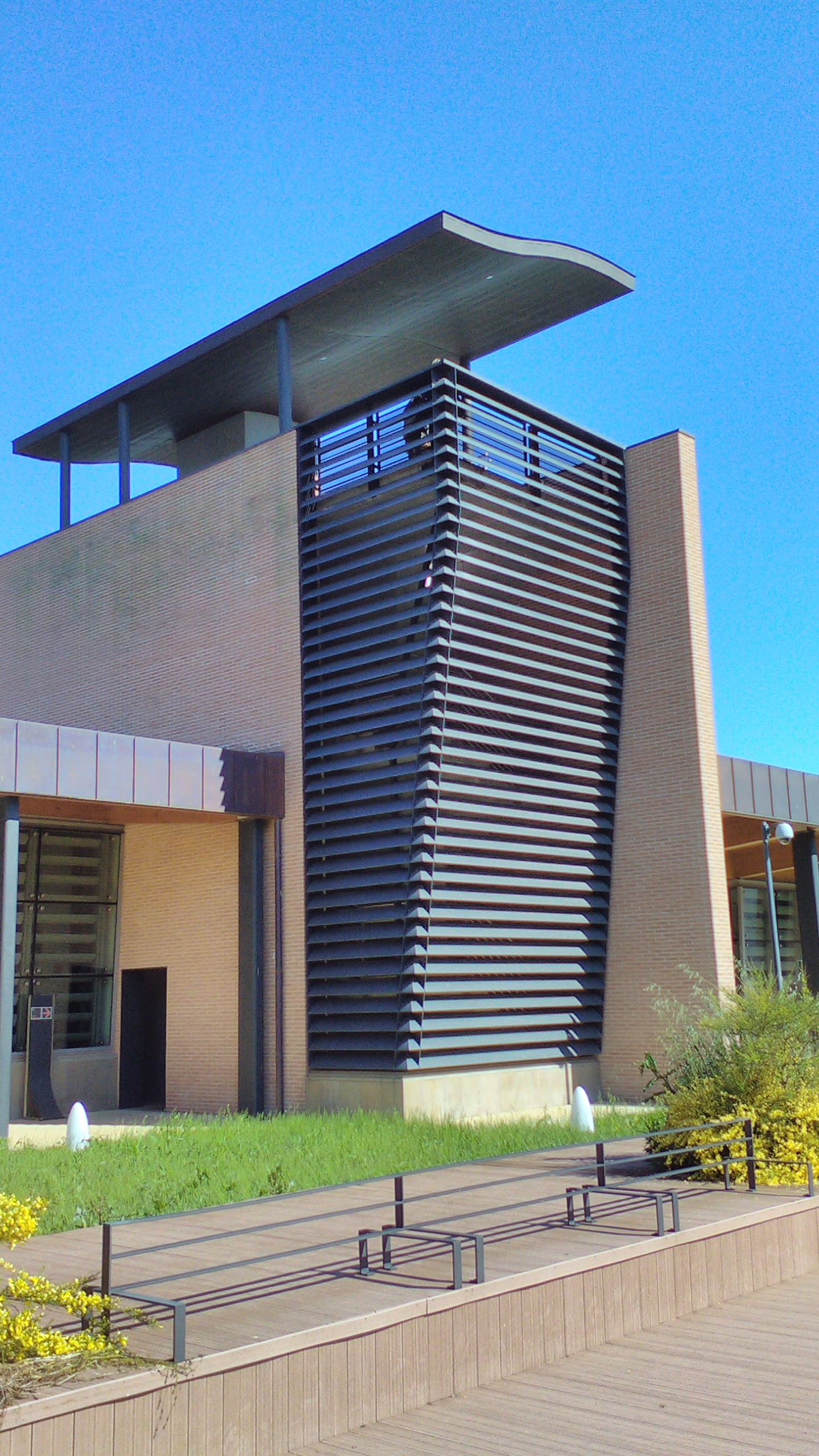
Observation tower at MANA

Because of the growing number of finds, it was decided to expand the museum and in 1984 the Italian national government acquired two buildings (part of a 19th century farm used for rice production) in the locality of "Fornace", not far from the first museum. However, due to lack of funds, the restoration work was interrupted after a short time. In December 2009, thanks to the intervention of the Veneto Region and funds allocated by the European Union for a total of 6 million euros, the restoration and restoration work resumed.

On December 12, 2014, the new museum was inaugurated, but it remained open for only one single day.

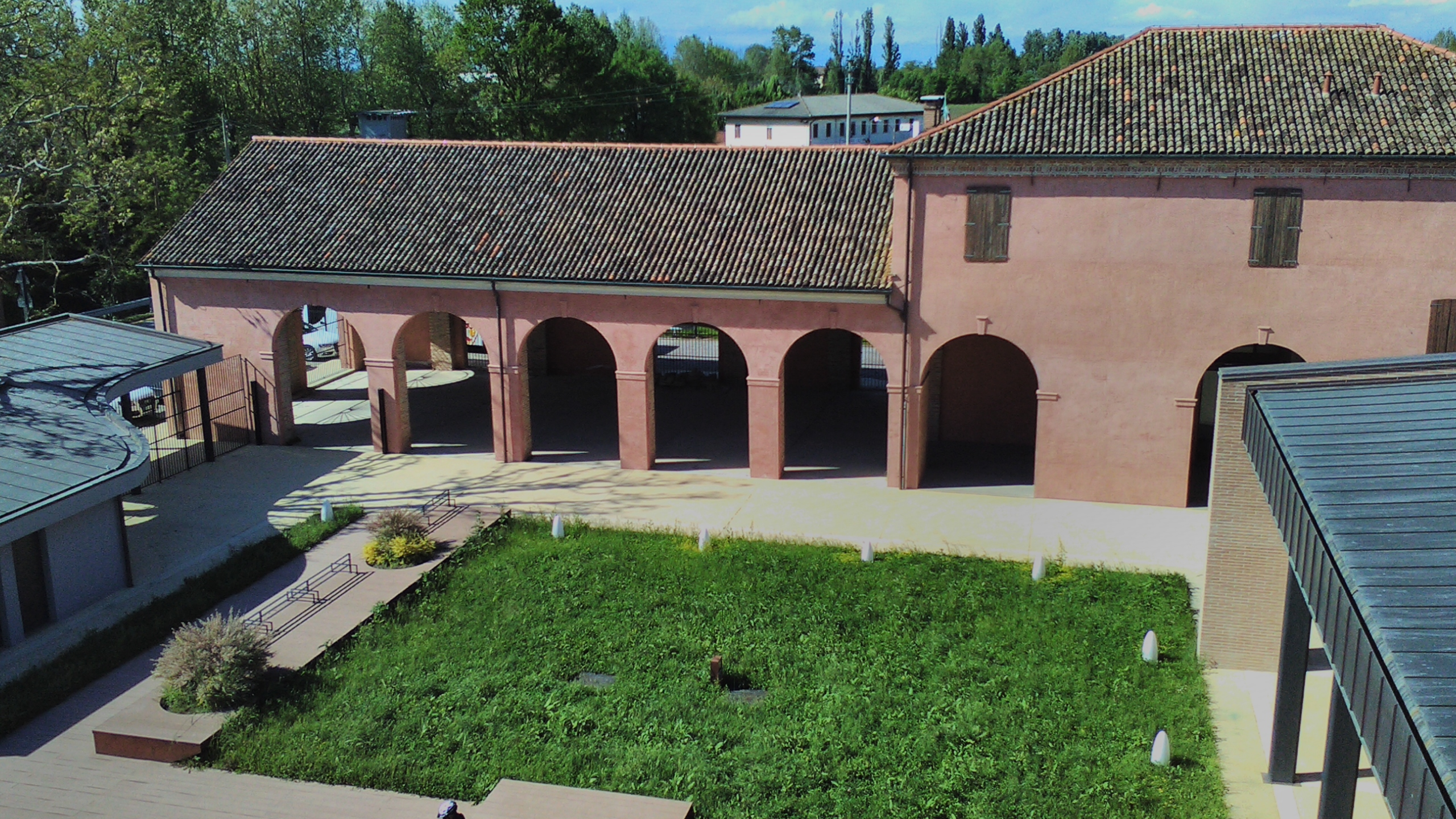
Barchessa at MANA

On 4 July 2015, the new seat of the Altino Archaeological Museum was definitively opened to the audience. Today it has about 1,800 m² of exhibition space (compared to 180 m² in the old headquarters, now used as a warehouse) on the three floors of the former rice farm, a barchessa and a new modern structure (designed by architect Stefano Filippi) with an observation tower over the surrounding countryside and the lagoon of Venice.

The spaces for restoration, cataloguing and creation of reproductions and photographs have been created, together with a book-shop and a cafeteria, but have not yet been activated.

== Exhibition ==
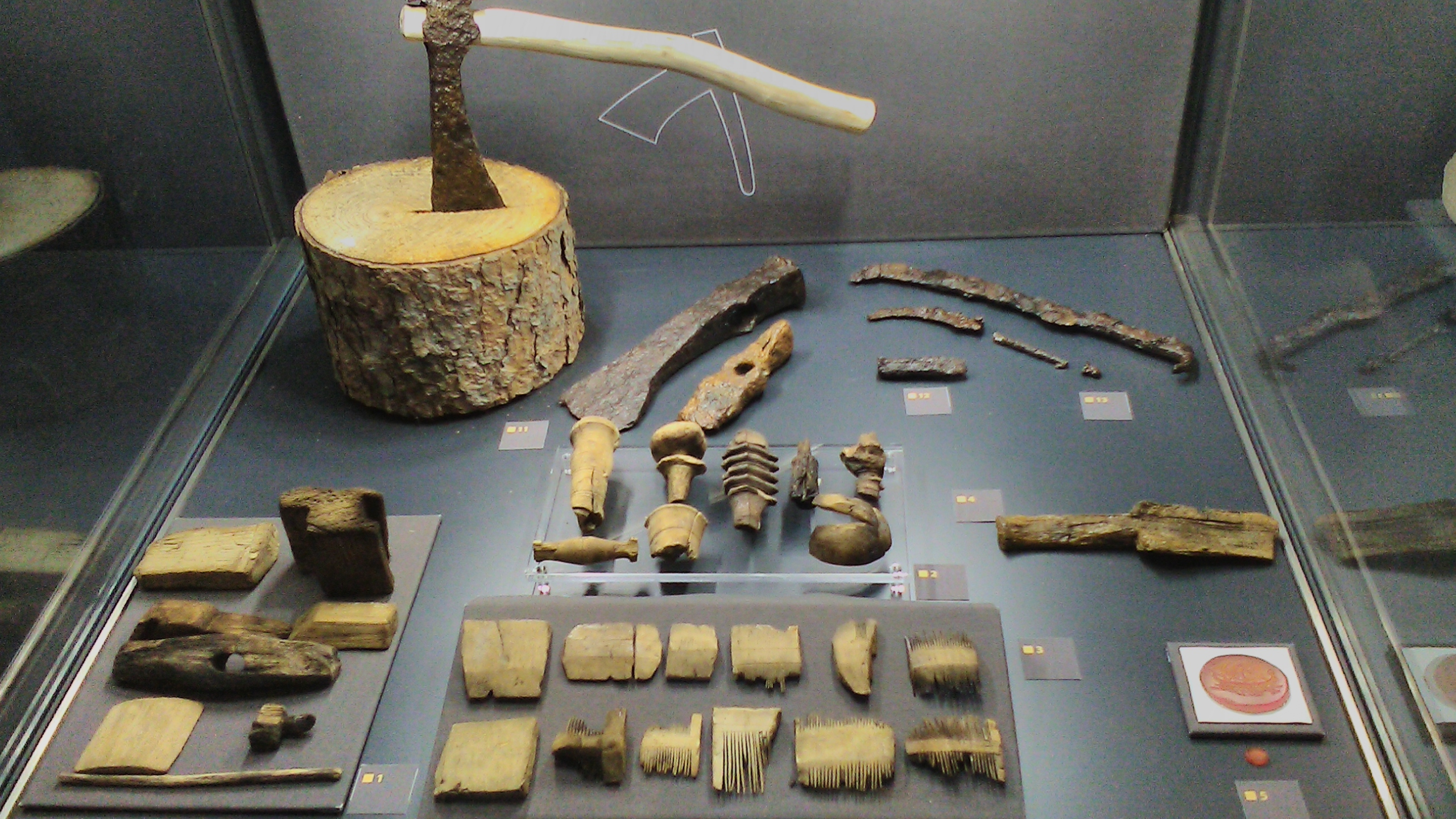
Prehistoric wooden items

In the first section, on the ground floor of the former rice farm, there is a selection of finds that testify to the prehistoric occupation of the lagoon margin in which Altinum was built between the 10th and 2nd BC; in the second section, there is evidence of the development of the centre through the Iron Age (1st millennium BC) according to a thematic scan: religion, settlement, language and writing, the necropolis (with reconstructions of some Venetian, Celtic and Romanized burials), up to the imposing tombs of horses with, next to it, the exposure of the relative harnesses, pieces of great value as they are rather rare.

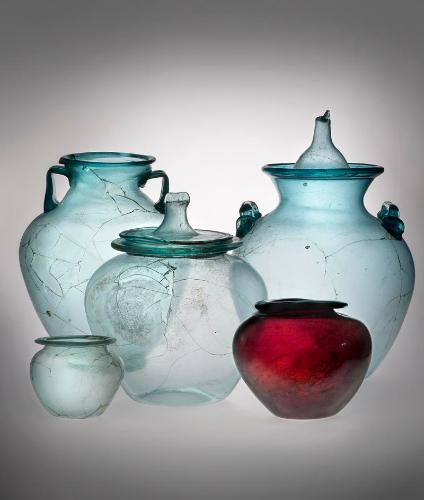
Glasses from the Roman era

The first floor is dedicated to the transformations of the center of Altinum documented through the centuries that led the indigenous settlement to the Romanization (2nd-1st century BC) and then the full Romanity (1st-3rd century AD), following once again a thematic criterion: the spatial and urban planning, roads, villas and domus, fashion and jewelry, characters, society, professions, trade. Here you will find some of the most significant objects of daily life of the Roman Altino: the gold necklace made in Taranto (datable between the end of 2nd and 1st century BC), the glass murrini, marble portraits that decorated the funeral monuments of the richest, but also toys for children and leather soles of the shoes of the ancient altinatians.

The second floor, not yet set up, will host a section on the altered Roman necropolises and one on the late antique history of the city.

The exhibition will be completed by a section dedicated to the emporical sanctuary in Fornace, the discovery of which highlighted the important role played by Altino as a commercial port pre-Roman and Roman, and the exhibition, on the third floor, of the findings of the late antiquity.

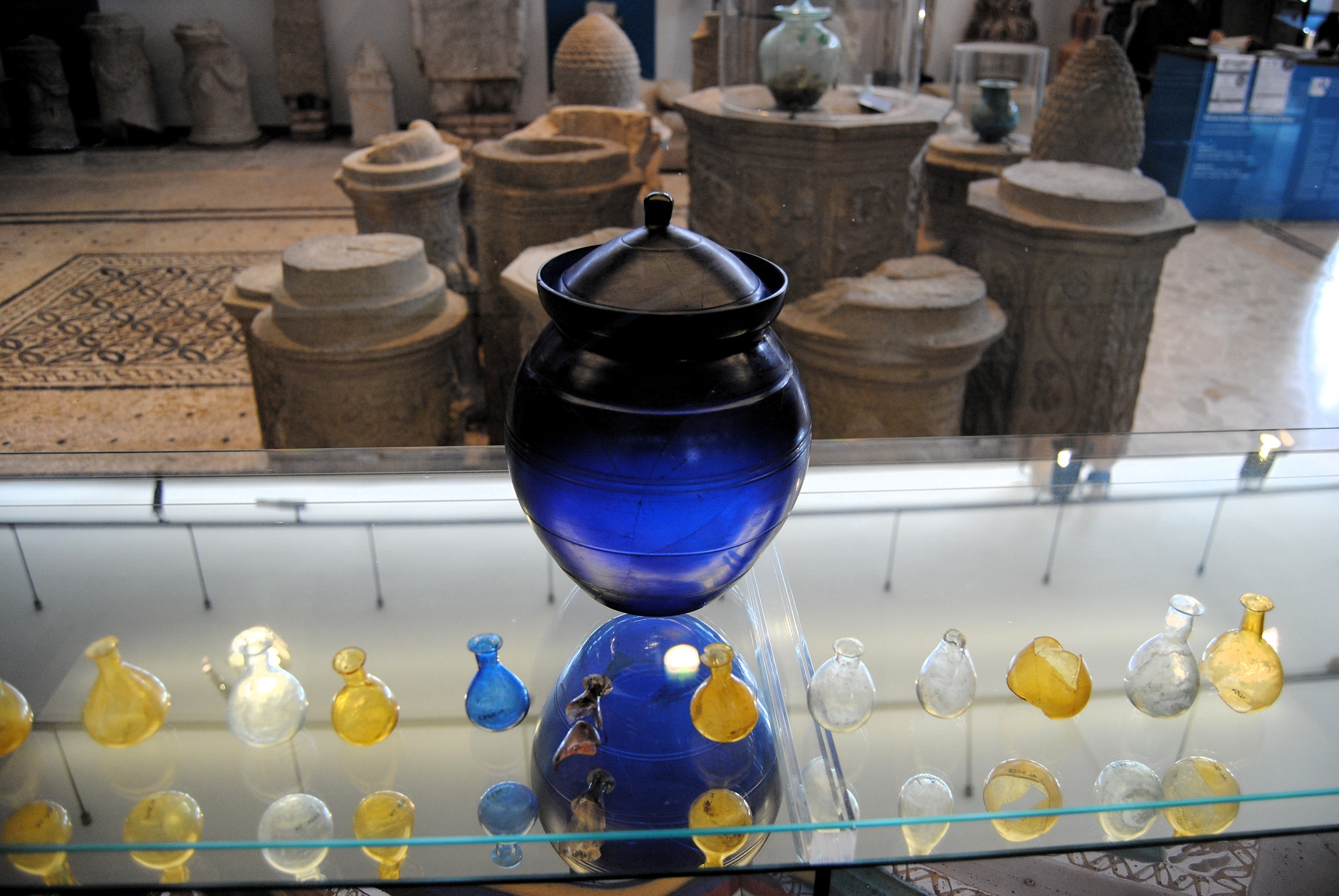

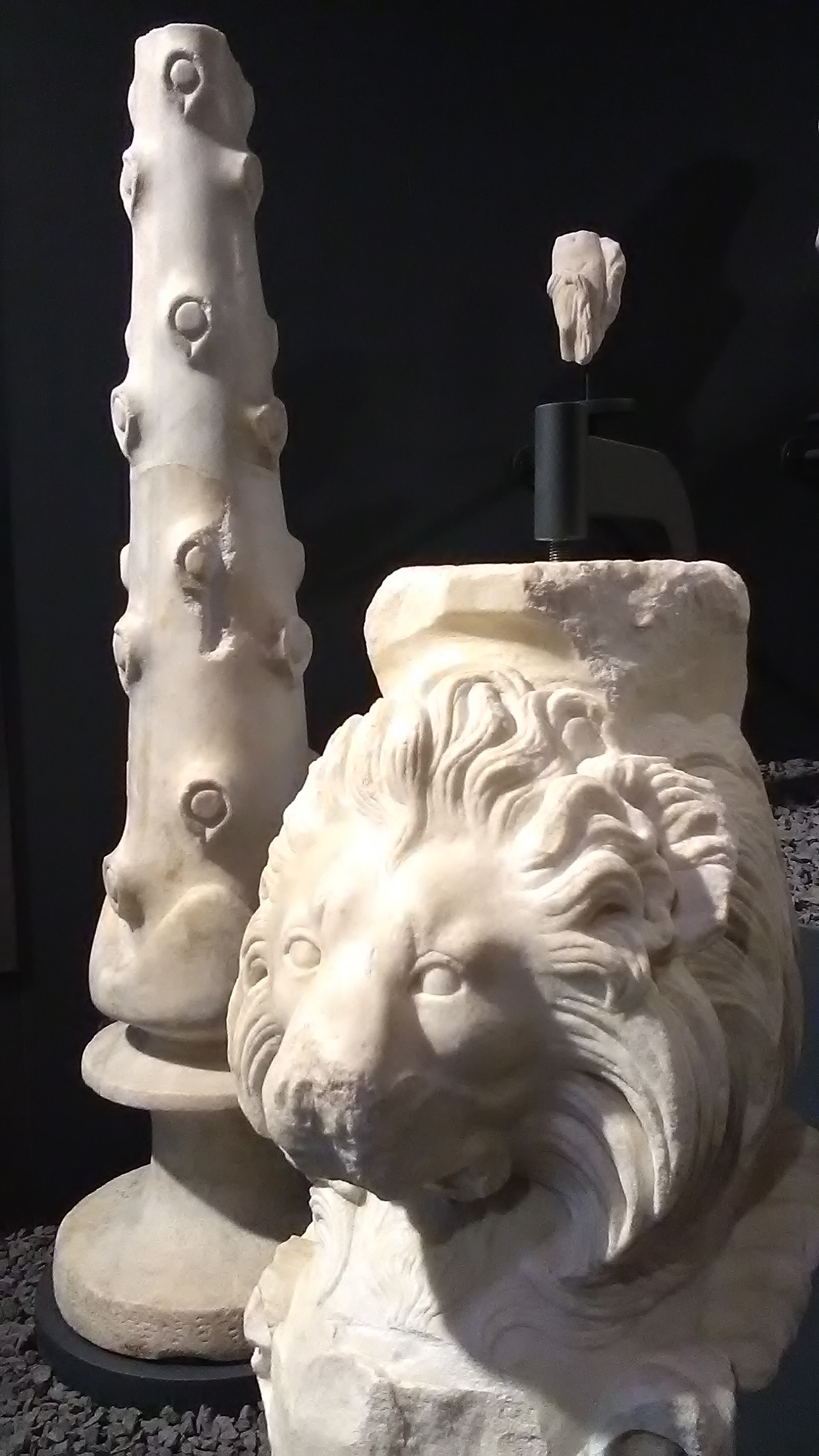

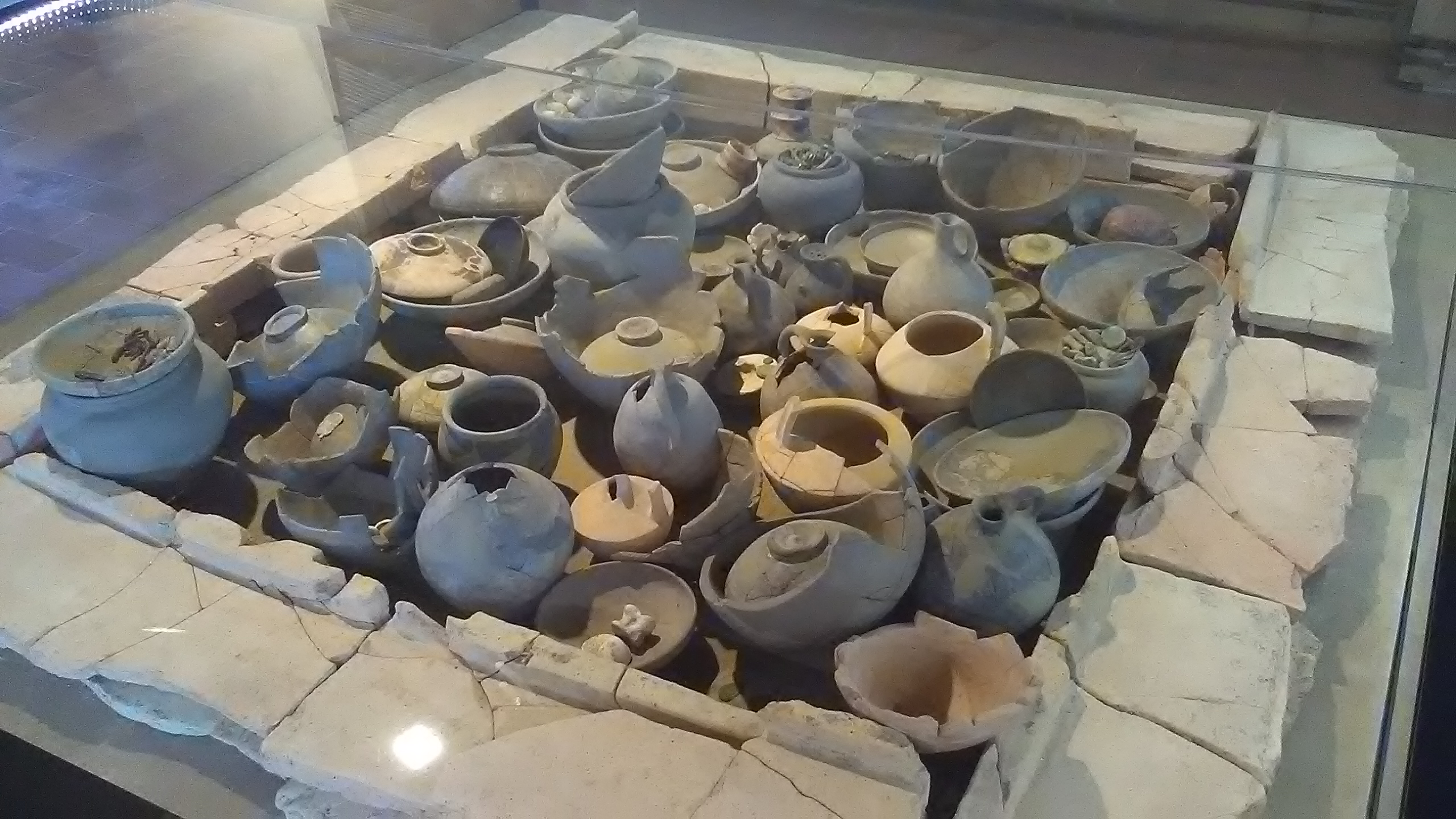

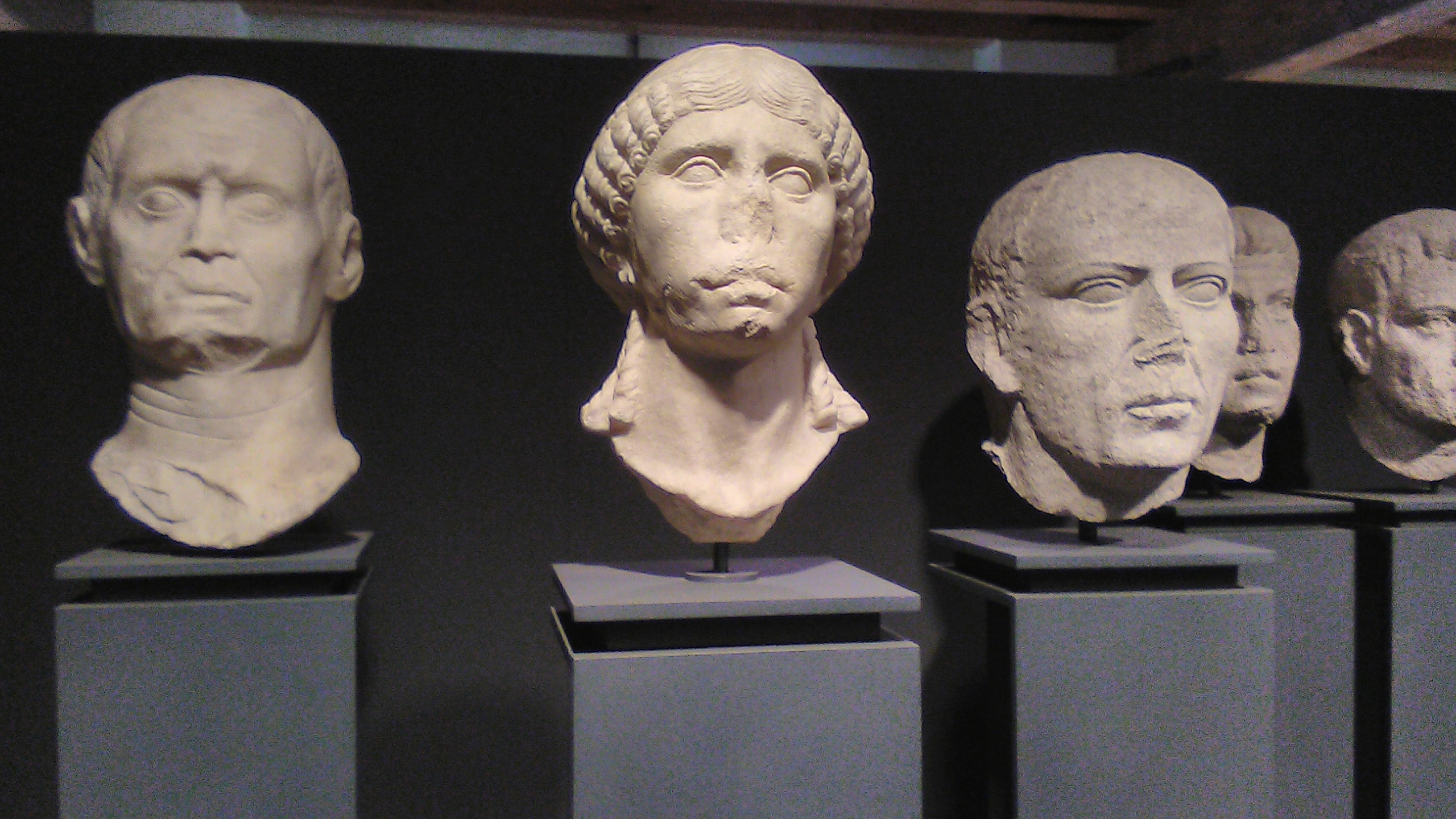

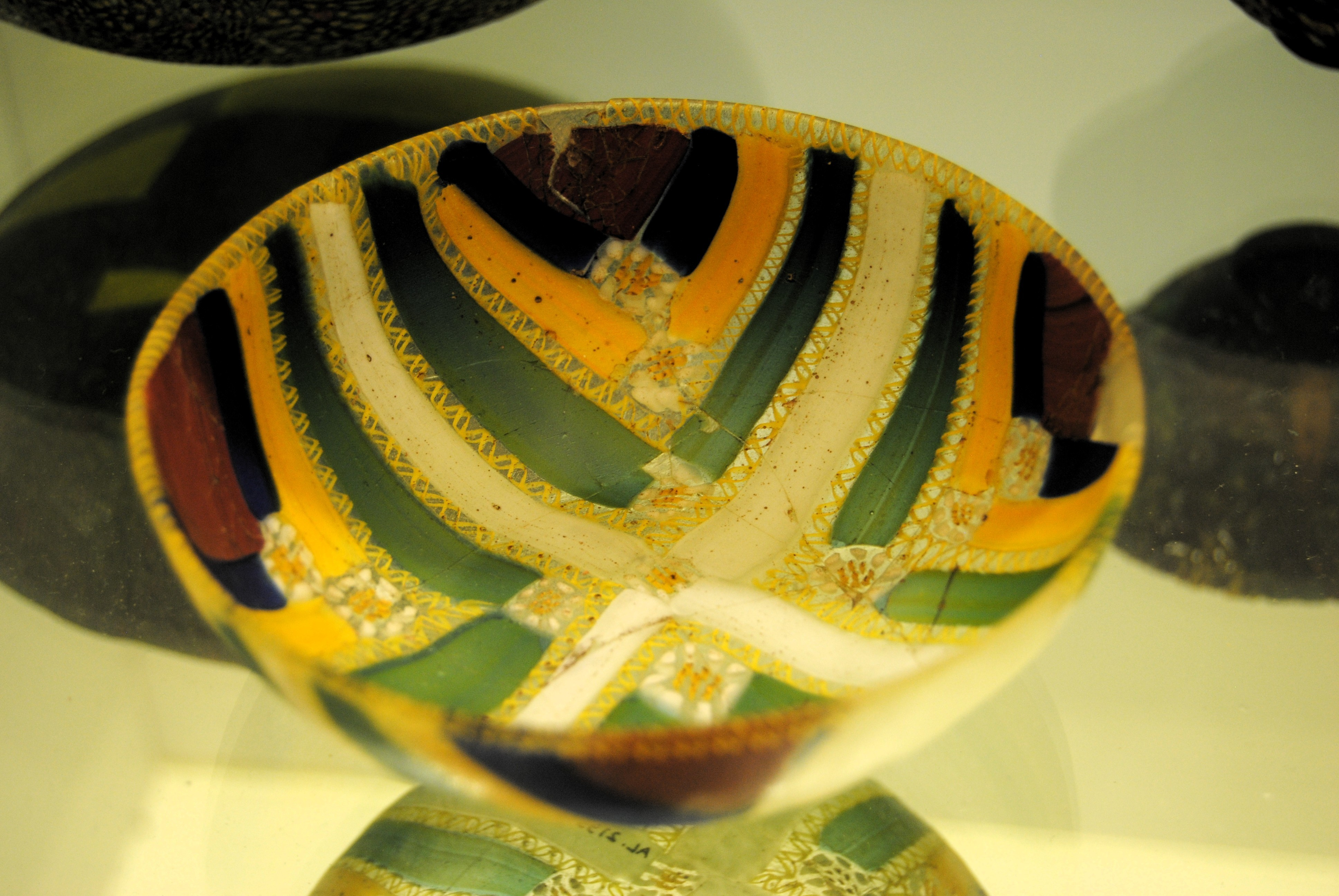

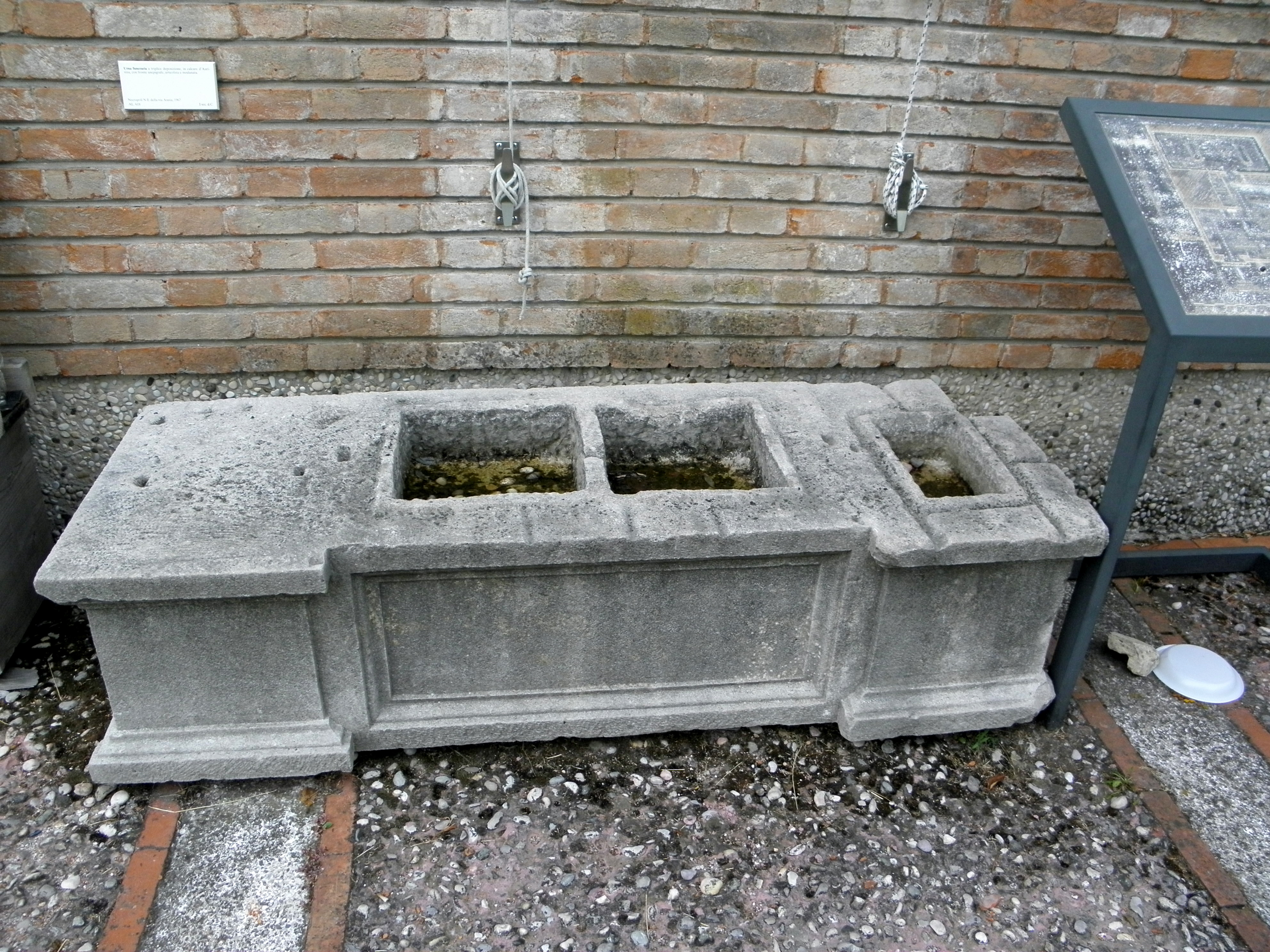

== Archaeological area of Altinum ==
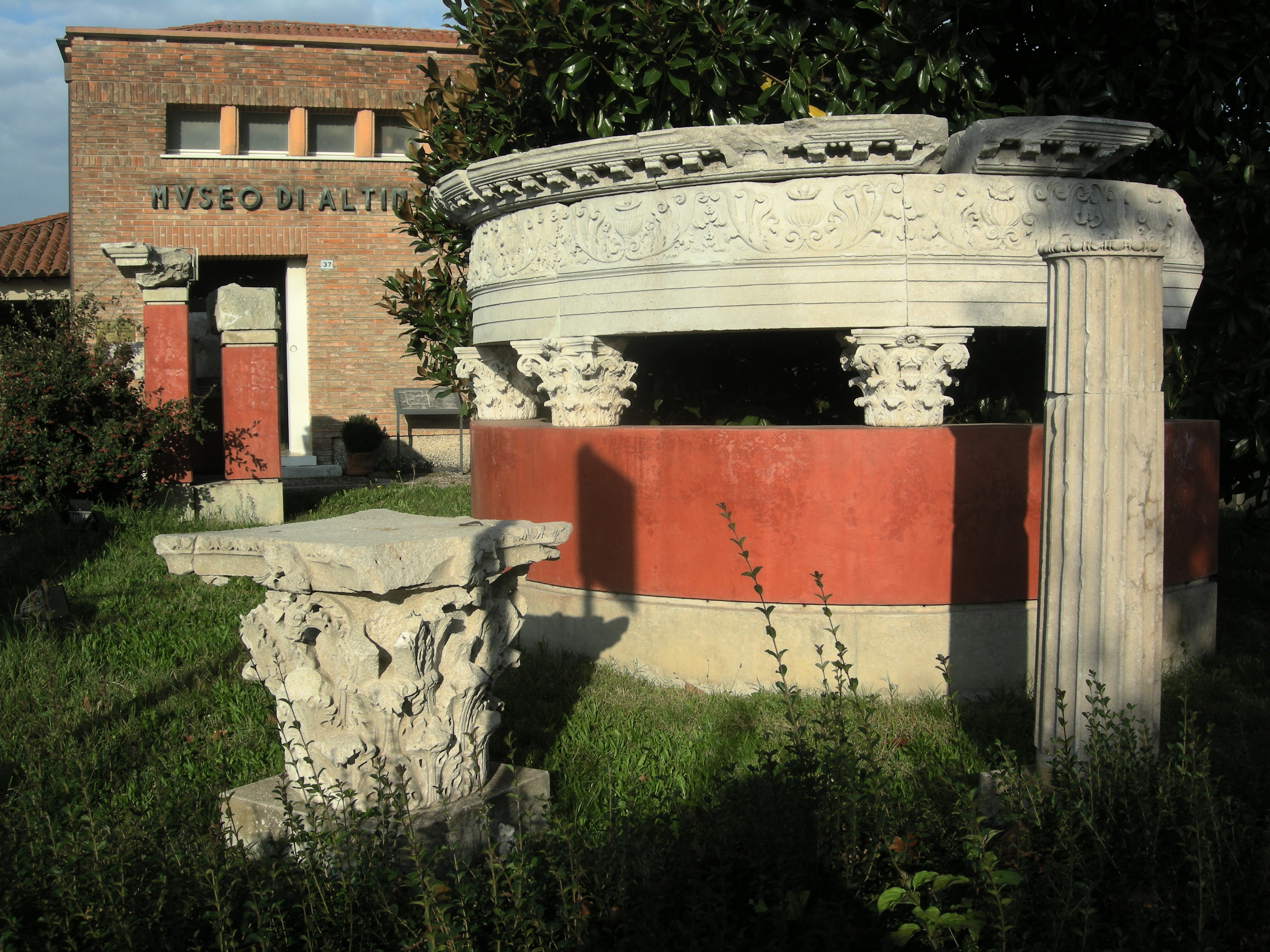
Columns and capitals on display outside the old museum building

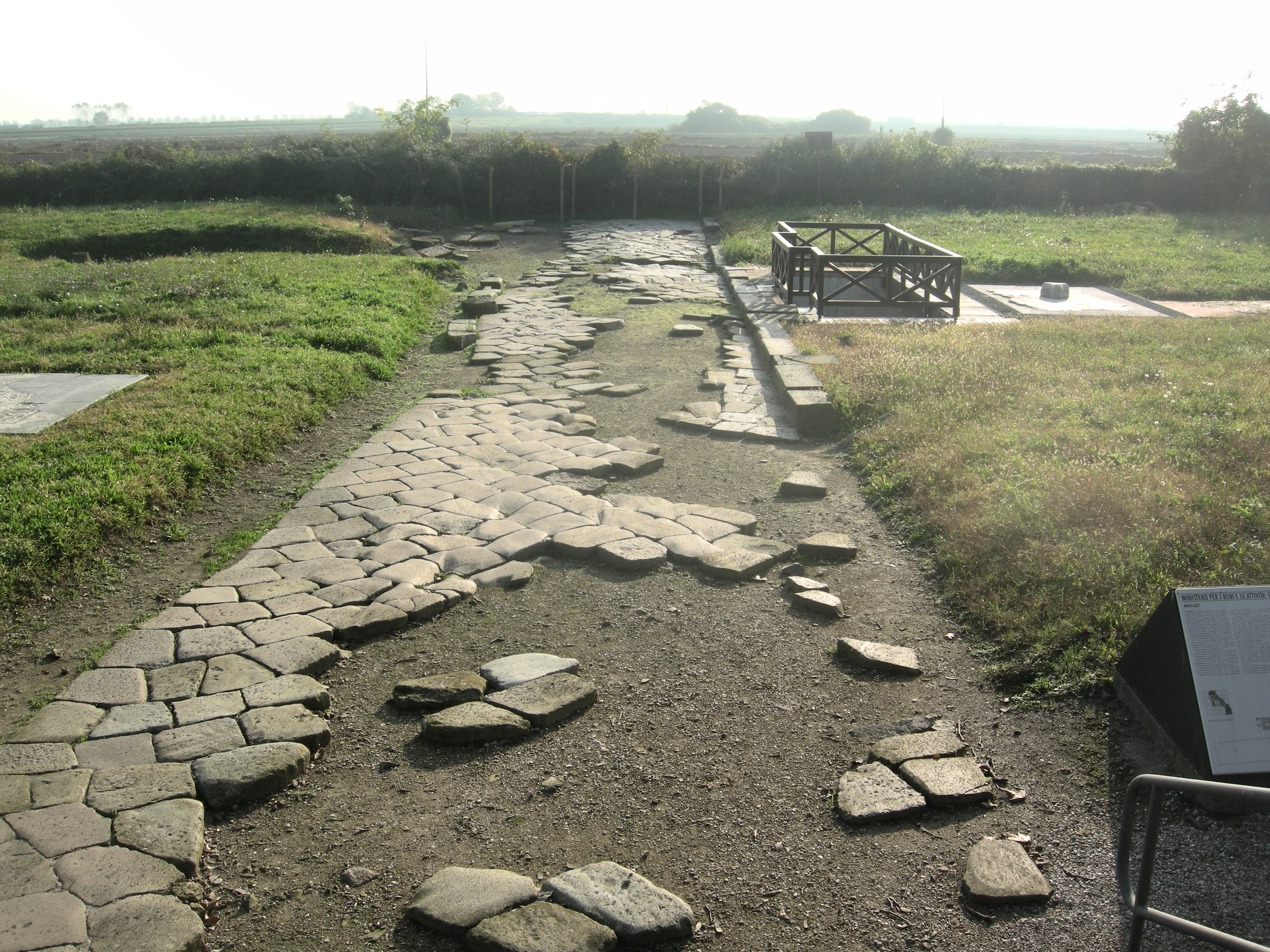
Remains of the decumanus that crossed the northeastern quarter of the city of Altinum

The archaeological area of Altinum is the archaeological reserve of the buried city, known in part through excavations and research from the nineteenth century onwards. As evidence of the ancient city, two archaeological sites can be visited, located about 500 metres (550 yd) away from the National Archaeological Museum of Altino and adjacent to AltinoLab, the former headquarters of the museum active from 1960 to 2015.

One of the two areas preserves the remains of the monumental landing gate, which from the first century BC marks the northern entrance into the city, and an urban hinge that connected the gate with the town.

In the other area it is possible to observe a small portion of the residential district, which was an urban expansion at the beginning of the first century AD. A stretch of urban road, paved with stone bases and bordered by crepidines, is particularly striking for its extraordinary state of conservation; on this road faces the domus of the Panther, so called because of the black and white mosaic in the atrium, which shows the animal while drinking.

== See also ==
- Altinum
- Quarto d'Altino
- Lagoon of Venice

== Bibliography ==
- Margherita Tirelli (1993). Il Museo Archeologico Nazionale e le aree archeologiche di Altino. Padua.
- Margherita Tirelli (2013). Altino. Museo archeologico nazionale di Altino. Venice: Regione del Veneto.
