= Altinum =

Ancient town of the Veneti

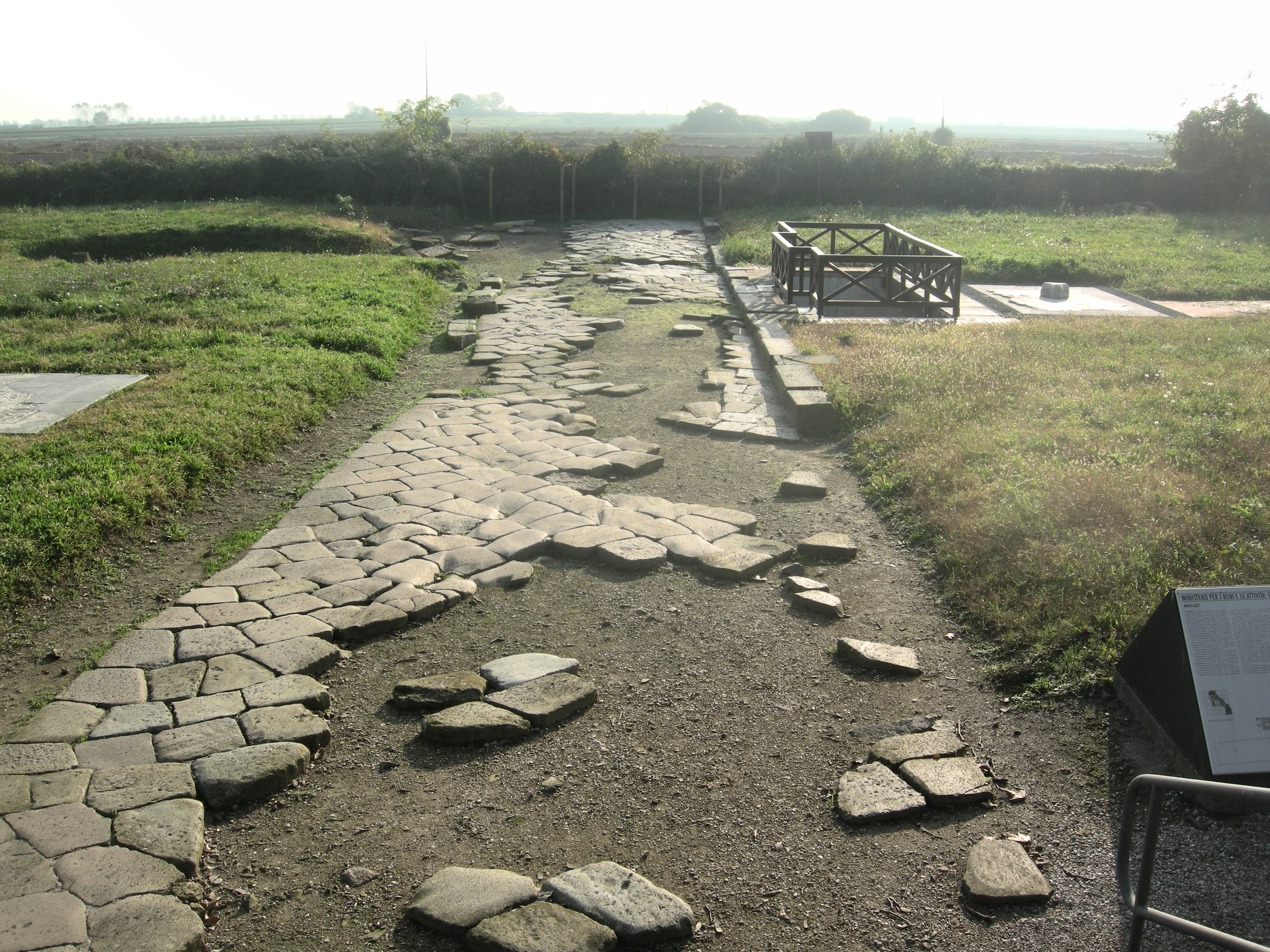
- Remains of the Roman decumanus

- Location of Altinum within Northern Italy
- 45°32′47″N 12°23′56″E
- Type: City
- Periods: Venetic, Roman, Gothic, Byzantine, Lombard
- Part of: Venetia et Histria

Altinum (in Altino, a frazione of Quarto d'Altino) was an ancient town of the Veneti 15 km southeast of modern Treviso, close to the mainland shore of the Lagoon of Venice. It was also close to the mouths of the rivers Dese, Zero and Sile. A flourishing port and trading centre during the Roman period, it was destroyed by Attila the Hun in 452. The town recovered, but was later abandoned when sea-borne sand began to cover it over. Its inhabitants moved to Torcello and other islands of the northern part of the lagoon.

Today Altinum is an archaeological area and has a national archaeological museum.

== Pre-Roman Altinum ==
Altinum was a Venetic settlement. The earliest human presence in the area is dated to the 10th century BCE and is related to hunter-gatherer groups. The earliest evidence of a settlement nucleus is dated from the mid-8th century to the mid-7th century BCE. In the 7th century BCE the settlement moved slightly to the northwest, in its historical location. A sacred area which is dated to the late 6th century BCE and developed in the 5th and 4th centuries BCE had votive offering objects from Greek, Magna Graecian, Etruscan and Celtic areas. This suggests that Altinum was the main port of the Veneti in the proto-historical age.

Archaeology indicates that in the late 6th/early 5th century BC, the Veneti had precocious contact with Celtic areas through the communication routes along the rivers Adige and Piave in the major centres in the plain of the River Po (Este and Padua and the Adriatic ports such as Atria, modern Adria, and Altinum). There was a trading relationship between high-ranking families. There was a degree of intermarriage. Some Celts settled in the region. Celtic gift and fashion objects appear in the burials of important families.

In the early 4th century BCE, the Gauls invaded the plain of the Po as far as Verona. This led to a gradual ethnic mixing and loss of cultural identity, especially in the border areas of the Veneti: Verona in the west and the Lagoon of Venice and the Piave valley in the east. In some places there was at times a transition from the traditional practice of cremation to inhumation and the deposition of weapons in burials, which was an exception to Veneti funerary culture. An example of this was found in a cemetery in Altinum. Such evidence suggests that inter-ethnic relations went beyond just trade and that there were clusters of foreign settlers. Perhaps they were traders, workers and/or mercenaries.

Strabo gave indications of the social, economic and ritual importance of horses and horse breeding among the pre-Roman Veneti. He wrote that they bestowed attention on horse rearing, "which, though now entirely abandoned, was formerly in great esteem among them, resulting from the ancient rage for breeding mules, which Homer thus mentions: "From the [Ve]neti for forest mules renowned." It was here that Dionysius, the tyrant of Sicily, kept his stud of race-horses. And, in consequence, the [Veneti] horses were much esteemed in Greece, and their breed in great repute for a long period." (Homer actually wrote "whence is the race of wild mules." Iliad II. 857) Strabo also noted that the Veneti paid honour to Diomedes by sacrificing a white horse.

In Altinum there was a large number of horses buried in a sacrificial pit at the town's sanctuary and in the cemetery area to the north of the town. In the latter there were some thirty horses, whereas in other Veneti towns there were only a few, except for a cemetery exclusively devoted to some thirty horses to the south of Este. These burials are dated to the 4th and 3rd centuries BCE. Evidence of sacrifice at the sanctuary continues into the Roman imperial period. Here the remains of some twenty horses were found alongside those of bovines, sheep, goats and pigs. The ritual offerings were the heads or parts of hindlegs or tails which were disarticulated, skinned and fleshed. Sketches of headless horses or body parts confirm this animal's key role in religious cults.

== Roman Altinum ==
Archaeological finds indicate that Altinum's perimeter was marked by waterways beyond which there were cemetery areas. The abundance of watercourses gives the picture of a town deeply tied to water, which was characteristic of towns in the Veneto. The transformation of Altinum from a Veneti to a Roman town started with the reorganisation of its marshy environment through the regulation of its waters and the expansion of its canal network. The main work was the digging of the Silocello canal to link the River Sile (which was to the north of the town) to the channel, which today is called Santa Maria and which flowed to the south of the town from the River Dese to the lagoon. The most important architectural finds are a town gate on the canal which marked the northern edge of the town, another public building which faced the canal which marked the southern edge of the town, and a temple close to the Santa Maria channel which was restructured in a monumental form from a 5th-century BCE wooden structure. (See the "Port and canals" section for Altinum's canals)

In 225 BCE the Veneti and Romans established an alliance treaty in the run-up to the Battle of Telamon between Rome and an alliance between the Insubres and Boii Gallic tribes of northern Italy and Gaesatae mercenaries. The foundation of the colony of Aquileia, in Celtic territory, as a fortress to protect northern Italy from invasions from the northeast and east was an important moment in the process of Romanisation of the Veneti and Altinum, which is traceable to the first half of the 2nd century BCE. Altinum came to be a half-way port and stopover between Ravenna and the new and important colony. Its port grew in size. This was also due to the Romans promoting sea trade in the upper Adriatic Sea.

The process of Romanisation was in part driven by the presence of Roman, Latin and Italic merchants attracted to this port by lucrative trade. Inscriptions attest to an early presence of the Publicia, Barbia, Cossutia and Saufeia families in Aquileia and Virunum (modern Magdalensberg), a town in Noricum (in present-day Austria) where there was iron mining. These were families of equestrian rank (the Roman entrepreneurial class). They went to Aquileia from central Italy, and from there they spread to the northern markets, including Altinum.

Sometime between 153 and 131 BCE, the Via Annia was built. It connected Atria (modern Adria) to Aquileia. It passed through Patavium (Padua) and then it ran close to the coast and passed through Altinum. In 131 BC the Via Popilia, which connected Ariminum (modern Rimini), Ravenna and Atria, was built. Thus, Altinum came to be connected overland to these important towns, facilitating the movement of goods. Again, its port increased in importance. Its inhabitants were granted Latin rights, a limited form of Roman citizenship, in 89 BCE, and in the last decades of the Roman Republic, in 49 BCE, they acquired full Roman citizenship and were assigned to the Scaptia Roman tribe. The town became a municipium, probably in 42–40 BCE.

Velleius Paterculus wrote that in the run-up to the final civil war of the Roman Republic (32–30 BCE) between Octavian (later known as emperor Augustus) and Mark Antony, Gaius Asinius Pollio kept Venetia under Mark Antony's control for a long time with his seven legions and accomplished brilliant things near Altinum and other towns in the region. He then joined Mark Antony. This was in 42–40 BCE. Pollio Asinius was either the last governor of the Venetia region of Roman Italy or a member of a commission charged with distributing land to war veterans. With his legions, he was able to give the towns in Venetia administrative autonomy by giving them the status of municipia without much trouble. It is likely that by saying that Asinius Pollio accomplished brilliant things ("magnis speciosisque rebus"), Velleius Paterculus was referring to Asinius allocating land to veterans near Altinum and Patavium and founding the colony of Iula Concordia (modern Oderzo) which Julius Caesar had probably planned but not accomplished.

Sometime between 31 and 12 BCE, Octavian established Ravenna's harbour as one of the home ports for his new navy. It became one of the main Roman military ports, and this favoured Altinum, as it increased the importance of the upper Adriatic Sea.

The town benefited from infrastructure commissioned by the emperor Claudius. In 46 CE he opened a branch of the Via Claudia Augusta from Altinum to Tridentum (today's Trento) in the Italian Alps. Drusus had started its construction in 15 AD. It connected Hostiglia (today's Ostiglia), on the River Po, to the "limes" at the Danube in southern Germany via Tridentum. Claudius also built a road along the coast which connected Altinum to Atria directly. He also extended the navigable route inside the Septem Maria lagoons, to Altinum with the construction of a further canal, the fossa Clodia, thus connecting it to Ravenna. Although this internal route only allowed navigation by smaller vessels, it guaranteed communication even through the worst weather. This enhanced Altinum's strategic and commercial importance as a hub for trade between the Mediterranean Sea, northeastern Italy and beyond the Alps.

During the civil wars which followed the death of the emperor Nero (see Year of the Four Emperors, 69 AD), Marcus Antonius Primus, who supported Vespasian's bid to depose Vitellius, advanced into Italy with his troops. Tacitus wrote that he occupied Aquileia and then he was "received with joy" at Opitergium (Oderzo) and Altinum and that a military contingent was left in Altinum in case of an attack by the fleet in Ravenna.

In 169, during the Marcomannic Wars (166–180 AD) the co-emperors Marcus Aurelius and Lucius Verus were returning to Rome from the front in Pannonia. Lucius Verus was said to have been hit by apoplexy near Altinum. He got off his carriage bleeding and was taken to Altinum, where he died after three days of not being able to speak. Some modern scholars believe that he may have been a victim of the Antonine Plague.

By the 4th century CE, Altinum became the seat of a bishopric. The first bishop was Heliodorus of Altino (died c. 410), He accompanied St Jerome on his first trip to the East. When he returned, he became the bishop of Altinum and attended the 381 CE anti-Arian Council of Aquileia in that capacity. Saint Jerome wrote letters to Heliodorus and his nephew Nepotianus, a priest. In a consolatory letter written to Heliodorus when Nepotianus died in 396, he mentioned that Altinum had many churches and martyr shrines and that the Nepotianus presbytery was adorned with flowers of all types, twigs and vine leaves. The cathedral (built by 381) had two entrances shaded by curtains. It had an altar, shiny floors, walls which were not covered by smoke, and an ancillary space related to the sacristy. St Jerome described Altinum as "a populous centre whose buildings were close to each other and many hearths which darkened the air with thick smog." Today Altinum is no longer a residential diocese. It is listed by the Catholic Church as a titular see.

The apex of Altinum's flourishing period was from the 1st century BCE to the 2nd century CE. Its size was comparable to that of Pompeii. A decrease in archaeological finds suggests that after this, Altinum, like the other towns in the Veneto region, began to decline. However, it retained a prominent role.

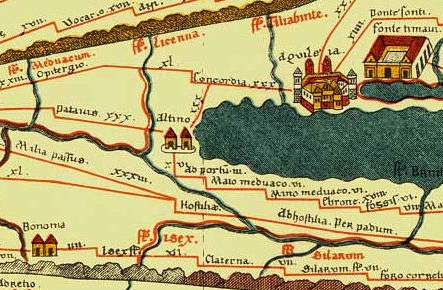
Altinum in the Tabula Peutingeriana

The Codex Theodosianus (Theodosian Code), a compilation of Roman laws under the Christian emperors from 312 to the 430s, was commissioned by Theodosius II and Valentinian III in 429 and published in 438. It records sixteen laws that were issued by emperors in Altinum, especially between 364 and 399. It also provides evidence that emperors in the second half of the 4th century often stayed in this town and that the imperial chancellery regularly worked there between 364 and 406. An early 5th-century revision of the Tabula Peutingeriana, an illustrated itinerarium of the Roman Empire, had a symbol depicting Altinum as a town with two towers, which represented it as an important and populous town.

Altinum and other towns and villages in the region were destroyed in 452 by Attila the Hun. According to the Chronicon Venetum et Gradense, the earliest Venetian chronicle, written by John the Deacon in the mid-10th and early 11th-century, refugees from Altinum fled to Torcello and other islands in the northern part of the Lagoon of Venice. Some of the inhabitants of these islands moved to the island group of Rivo Alto, in the central part of the lagoon, 450–500 years later and contributed to the development of a new city, Venice. Thus, according to the tradition, which is still deeply ingrained, the origins of Venice are related to the destruction of Altinum by Attila, its demise, and the refugees who fled from this town. The invasion of northern Italy by the Lombards in 568, which spared the lagoons of the northwestern coast of Italy, which were under Byzantine influence, has also been held responsible for this demise. The implicit assumption is that this gave a final blow to the remnants of the town. However, archaeological investigations have disproved this notion. Although Attila's actions may well have further contributed to the decline of the town, Altinum overcame this and continued to exist for several centuries.

The features of the coast of northeastern Italy were changing. The Altinum area slowly became covered by sand brought by the sea, which turned into mud, starting from the Roman imperial period. Generally, the inland Roman towns, from Grado to Ravenna, were becoming less and less suited as ports. There was a shift from single ports controlled by the imperial authorities to peripheral ports in satellite areas along new river routes most probably controlled by new investors and ship owners. Trade moved these places. In the case of Altinum, it moved to Torcello, which was on a fluvial channel through the lagoon which led to the open sea. Archaeological excavations in the inland towns and the lagoons have not revealed any sudden population movements and sharp population increases in the satellite ports or in Torcello as could be expected with an influx of refugees. The finds show that there was a gradual colonisation of the lagoons, a slow shift over centuries which had already started in the Roman days.

Besides the slowly developing troubles of the inland ports, the trend was also favoured by economic changes and new economic opportunities, such as fish farming and salt production. Agriculture played a secondary but fundamental role in favouring new stable settlements through intensive cultivation of limited land areas, which were probably uncultivated. If so, they could be used by military elites who had the means for productive and, above all, infrastructural investment. In Torcello, embankments were built to protect the island. Mooring facilities and warehouses were built to service sea trade. Calaon argues that archaeology shows that the bishop of Torcello, a landowning aristocrat, built his church in Torcello "not so much because he feared barbarian raids, but because he had made a strategic choice. He chose to place his see in a peripheral but flourishing district, perhaps one of the most populous of the whole countryside."

After the fall of the western part of the Roman Empire (conventional date 476 CE), the Ostrogoths invaded Italy and established the Gothic Kingdom (493–553). The Byzantine emperor Justinian I (527–565) decided to annex Italy to the Byzantine Empire. This led to the Gothic War (535–554) between the Byzantines and the Ostrogoths, which was won by the former. Byzantine rule in northern Italy was short-lived as the Lombards invaded northern Italy (568–73) except for the lagoons of northeastern coast of Italy. Altinum eventually came under the duchy of Treviso of the Kingdom of the Lombards (568–774).

Narses, the Byzantine military commander in Italy in the final stage of the Gothic War, managed to capture Vitale, the bishop of Altinum, who many years earlier had taken refuge in Aguntum in Noricum, near modern Lienz If there had been a partial withdrawal by Altinum's top clergy, this would have been during Gothic Wars.

Paul the Deacon, the Lombard historian, wrote that the bishop of Altinum took part in the synod of Marano (590) during the Schism of the Three Chapters (553–698).

A 590 letter the Byzantine commander in Altinum wrote to Childebert I, one of the kings of the Franks, attests that Altinum still had town walls.

The move of the bishop of Torcello is assigned to the 5th century or within the 7th century. However, it followed a long and tortuous course which ended for good in the early 11th century.

== Mentions by ancient writers ==
Marcus Valerius Martialis (Martial), the 1st-century poet, wrote: "You banks of Altinum, that rival the rural beauties of Baiae, ... and you, Aquileia ... You shall be the haven and the resting-places of my old age, if my retirement be at my own disposal." Baiae was a popular seaside resort in the Bay of Naples which was very fashionable among rich Romans.

Strabo, the 1st-century BCE geographer, gave a description of northern Italy and the Veneto: "The whole of this country is full of rivers and marshes, especially the district of the Veneti, which likewise experiences the tides of the sea. This is almost the only part of our sea [The Mediterranean] which is influenced in the same manner as the ocean, and, like it, has ebb and flood tides. In consequence most of the plain is covered with lagoons. The inhabitants have dug canals and dikes, after the manner of Lower Egypt, so that part of the country is drained and cultivated, and the rest is navigable. Some of their cities stand in the midst of water like islands, others are only partially surrounded. Such as lie above the marshes in the interior are situated on [navigable rivers] ... continually swelled by the rains and snows."

Strabo also described Ravenna and Altinum: "Situated in the marshes is the great [city of] Ravenna, built entirely on piles, and traversed by canals, which you cross by bridges or ferry-boats. At the full tides it is washed by a considerable quantity of sea-water, as well as by the river, and thus the sewage is carried off, and the air purified ... It is a remarkable peculiarity of this place, that, though situated in the midst of a marsh, the air is perfectly innocuous ... Another remarkable peculiarity is that of its vines, which, though growing in the marshes, make very quickly and yield a large amount of fruit, but perish in four or five years. Altinum stands likewise in the marshes, its situation being very similar to that of Ravenna."

In his description of the Veneto Region, Pliny the Elder, the 1st-century BCE and CE naturalist, wrote that the River Sile flows from the hills of Treviso to Altinum. Regarding the River Po, he wrote, "There is no river known to receive a larger increase than this in so short a space; so much so indeed that it is impelled onwards by this vast body of water, and, invading the land, forms deep channels in its course: hence it is that, although a portion of its stream is drawn off by rivers and canals between Ravenna and Altinum, for a space of 120 [Roman] miles, still, at the spot where it discharges the vast body of its waters, it is said to form seven seas ... and ... "The next mouth [of the Po] ... the [Etruscans] formerly made from Sagis, thus drawing the impetuous stream of the river across into the marshes of the Atriani, which they call the Seven Seas; and upon which is the noble port of Atria ..." By invading the land, Pliny meant floods. The seven seas (Septem Maria) were the series of lagoons which the emperor Clausius connected to Altinum (see above). Atria is now modern Adria.

Vitruvius, the 1st-century BCE Roman architect, wrote about laying out the ground in marsh areas. "... if in marshes walls are laid out, and these marshes are along the sea, and they look towards the north or between the north and east, and these marshes are higher than the sea coast, they will seem to be reasonably laid out. For if dykes are cut, there is made an outlet of water to the beach; and when the sea is swollen by storms, there is an overflow into the marshes, which being stirred and moved about and mixed with sea salt, does not permit the various kind of marsh creatures to be born there: moreover, those which, by swimming from higher parts, arrive near the coast, are killed by the unfamiliar saltness. An instance of this may be found in the Gallic marshes which are round Altinum, Ravenna, Aquileia and other townships in like places which are nearest the marshes. For owing to these causes, they have an incredible salubrity." This description fits the walls and canals system of Altinum.

In his Commentary on the Georgics of Virgil, Maurus Servius Honoratus, a grammarian (floruit late 4th century), wrote this about the lintres (small flat-bottomed boats): "Lintres: small river vessels. It is not without reason that [Virgil] remembers the lintres, because in most of Venetia, rich in rivers, every trade is carried out on lintres, such as in Ravenna and Altinum, where even hunting, fowling and the cultivation of the fields are carried out in the litres."

Grattius Faliscus (63 BC–14 AD) a poet known for his Cynegeticon, a poem on hunting, wrote about types of woods to be used for hunting. He mentioned the pine wood and the broom from Altinum. Broom was used to make arrows.

Regarding the Pectine nigerrimi cockles, Pliny the Elder wrote, "the pectine, the biggest ones and among them those more black in the summer are the most they are found at Mytilene, Tindari, Salona, Altinum ..."

In his treatise on agriculture (De Re Rustica), Lucius Junius Moderatus Columella (4–70 CE) wrote, "For this use it is better to procure cows from Altinum, which the people of the area call "Ceve". They are short and produce a great abundance of milk, it is for this reason that this breed is bred ..." He also wrote that while previous generations of farmers considered sheep from Calabria, Apulia and Mileto to be the best, in his days, "the breed form Gallia [northern Italy] best is considered the most valuable one, especially the one from Altinum."

Sheep grazing was important in the Roman days as people wore woollen clothes. Regarding white wool, Martial wrote, "Apulia is noted for fleeces of the first quality; Parma for those of the second. The sheep whose wool is of the third quality distinguishes Altinum." Tertullian 155–c. 240? BCE) mentioned "... the sheep of Mileto, Selegas, Altinum, or those for which Tarentum or Baetica are renowned, because the nature of those places gives colour to the wool." The 301 Edict on Maximum Prices issued by the emperor Diocletian assigned the wool of Altinum a rather high price (200 denarii per pound). It also assigned a pay of 30 denarii per pound to the workers who made wool in Tarentum, Laodicea and Altinum.

== Medieval history ==
By the 10th century, the area of Altinum was totally abandoned. The bishop of Altinum moved to the island of Torcello (see above). The bishops of Torcello stressed their Altinum lineage and retained the juridical title of bishop of Altinum for centuries. The monks of the monastery of Santo Stefano moved to the Tumba Leseda island (nowadays it is called La Salina) in the archipelago of the settlement of Ammiana in 900. They established the monastery of Santi Felice e Fortunato. Both settlements were in the northern part of the Lagoon of Venice.

Documentation about the area in this period is scant and comes mostly from ecclesiastic institutions (the monasteries of Santi Felice e Fortunato and of San Giorgio Maggiore and the bishop of Torcello) or from families which owned land in the area (the Carbonara, Collalto, Marcello and Querini). A 1095 text attested to the existence of an Altino Maiore and an Altino Pitulo, which indicates that there was still a village and that it may have split into two parts. The text also indicates that the churches of Santa Maria (the old cathedral), San Martino e Sant'Apollinare still existed.

In 1388, when the Republic of Venice annexed the Treviso area, which reached the mainland shore of the Lagoon of Venice, wealthy Venetians founded an agricultural village close to the shore and to the site of Altinum. It was named San Michele del Quarto after a small church which was four Roman miles from Altinum.

== Despoliation of the town ==
After Altinum was abandoned, there was a gradual despoliation of its buildings and cemetery stones for use as building materials in Torcello and other islands in the lagoon and in the future Venice because there was a lack of building materials in the lagoon. The 16th-century humanists and subsequent antiquarians and scholars traced some of the stones from Altinum through the search of inscriptions from the Roman age. In the second half of the 19th century, Theodor Mommsen aimed at cataloguing the entire body of Latin epigraphy in Venice. Under the Altinum entry he collected and translated 181 inscriptions. Many were of uncertain provenance, and only a small part is securely identifiable.

== Archaeological and remote sensing studies ==
Archaeological studies started to develop mainly after the draining of this marsh area in the early 20th century. Altinum is the only large Roman town in Northern Italy and one of the few in Europe where medieval towns were not built on top of them. This makes archaeological research easier and allows remote sensing surveys to be carried out.

The finds of flint artefacts attributable to the sauveterrian culture have revealed the presence of hunter-gatherer groups in 9500–6500 BCE. The wetland environment, which was rich in vegetation due to watercourses fed by melting ices and springs in the plain, made up for the survival difficulties created by the hot and arid climate of the late boreal age. The finds of shells and sea molluscs suggest the use of food resources of the coastal environment. In those days the Lagoon of Venice had not formed yet, and the coastline was a few kilometres further inland than it is now. Human presence in the areas by the Adriatic coast continued in the subsequent millennia with late Mesolithic (6,500–5,500 BCE) hunter-gatherer groups.

An early Neolithic site of farmers and grazers with artefacts typical of the cultures of central-northern Italy of this time has been found in the nearby Tessera. In Altinum, artefacts dating from the Neolithic to the early Copper Age have been found.

Starting from the mid-Bronze Age (1600 BCE), there was a colonisation of the plain of the River Po and central-eastern Veneto. A late Bronze Age (1300–1000 BCE) subapennine culture (1350–1150 BCE) site has been found to the northeast of Altinum. There have been finds dated to this period on the Siloncello canal very close to Altinum (to the northeast) and in the town. A settlement on sandy mounds close to the River Sile was abandoned in the early Bronze Age due to marine ingression.

Aegean pottery was found on the islands of Torcello and Mazzorbo. These were probably along a sea trade route from the Aegean Sea and the eastern Mediterranean to the Altinum area between the 9th and 7th centuries BCE. This route continued to be used in the Iron Age, as attested by the finds of Attic pottery in these two islands and other islands in the northern part of the Lagoon of Venice (San Tommaso dei Bognomi, San Giacomo in Paludo, Vignole and Sant'Erasmo).

A land path with a fort equipped with wooden elements has also been traced from Ca' Tron and Portegrandi, to the northeast of Altinum. It preceded the Via Annia. It might have connected these two coastal centres to other coastal centres on the Adriatic Sea from the 11th century on and to the inland centres and the Alps via the rivers Sile and Piave.

For information related to Altinum's contacts with Celtic groups, see the Pre-Roman Altinum section above.

Until the 1990s it was thought that the origins of Altinum were dated to the 7th century BCE. More recently, a burial attributable to the late Bronze Age was found. It was contemporary to other materials found in the nearby areas (by the River Zero, close to the coast of the lagoon and to the east). This has led to the hypothesis that the earliest protohistoric settlement nucleus was close to the Santa Maria channel (see below). The earliest trace of human activity in Altinum is datable to the first half of the 8th century BCE. It is a simple quarry for fictile materials similar to those found in other Veneti centres dated to a slightly earlier time. The quarry was later filled in by a settlement centred around a large building (13 m long and 6.75 m (22.1 ft) wide) with two internal asymmetric spans which must have supported a double-pitched roof. Soon afterwards the narrower side was widened with a portico. It was active in the second half of the 8th century BCE and was abandoned in the first quarter of the 7th century BCE. It is one of the oldest attestations of square-plan buildings in the Veneto. It is derived from housing and productive prototypes found in Treviso, Oderzo and Concordia Sagittaria. In the next phase, after a brief period of abandonment, the site seems to have changed to a workshop area. There was a wooden well connected to a small canal system and a small furnace until the mid-7th century BCE. Thus, the earliest evidence of a settlement nucleus is dated from the mid-8th century to the mid-7th century BCE. Then the area was briefly unused before it was devoted to a sacred area.

In the 7th century BCE, the settlement moved slightly to the northwest, in its historical location. This is attested by aerial photography, stratigraphy and sample excavations below the ruins of the Roman town. It was on a man-made mound. Two sacred areas have been found in diametrically opposite locations to the north and to the south of the settlement. The first one was identified indirectly through the find of a fragment of an altar with an inscription dedicated to the god Belatukadro. The second one was found during the restructuring works of the museum area and was excavated from 1997 to 2000. It is dated to the late 6th century BCE and developed in the 5th and 4th centuries BCE. Dedicative inscriptions in Venetic language and alphabet indicate that it was dedicated to Arno or Altinum, a god of the Veneti. Thus, the town was named after this god. It had a commercial role, the protection of the trade in local agricultural and manufacturing goods and horses, and the imports from the Mediterranean Sea and from beyond the Alps. This is indicated by its location by the Santa Maria channel, which connected it to the lagoon. Moreover, its votive deposits, which had objects from Greece, Magna Graecia and the Etruscans, were in the plain of the River Po. Its function as an emporium is shown by inscriptions. These also show a male and military character due to the need to protect the traded goods. It was one of the main pre-Roman sanctuaries in the region.

In the 5th century BCE, this sanctuary was a large outdoor space enclosed by a rectangular portico which had two symmetric cells at the centre of its short sides. Two large ash altars were found inside the courtyard and in parallel with the cells. The deposit pits with the sacrificial remains and the votive objects were found outside this area. The remains of many horses were found in a pit at the edge of the sanctuary. The sacred area progressively grew until Romanisation (2nd–1st century BCE). This denotes an increase in the number of pilgrims as the town's trade in the Adriatic Sea increased. In the second half of the 1st century BCE, the sanctuary came to be devoted to the Roman god Jupiter and assumed the look of a sacred wood.

Stratigraphy related to the late Bronze Age and the transition to the Iron Age was found to the southeast of the town in the late 1990s and further out to the north-east, close to the River Sile, in 2005. In 2002, tombs datable to the late 6th–early 5th century BCE were found at the eastern edge of the town and to its north, by the River Zero. They were related to a cemetery investigated in the late 1970s. The pre-Roman cemetery area to the north of Altinum covered the whole of the northern strip, which was later crossed by the northern tract of the Via Annia and the Roman period cemetery. It stretched to the left bank of the River Zero. This arrangement of cemetery areas at the edge of a town and separated by watercourses was typical of other pre-Roman Veneti towns, such as Este and Padua. It can be surmised that watercourses had a particular role in funerary ceremonies and represented a route from the town of the living to that of the dead and a transition to the afterlife.

In 1999–2002, ditches and cemetery areas were found in a section of the Via Annia to the southwest of Altinum. Their dating is problematic as the road was progressively widened until it reached a width of 12 m (39 ft). In the area of the Via Claudia Augusta, to the north-west of the town, there were traces of ditches and small canals attributable to a late antiquity systematic parcelling out of land and maintenance interventions. Larger areas of land divisions were noted in the mentioned areas to the southwest which were linked to a network of ditches and canals. Similar traces were found to the south and further away from the town (5 km), close to the edge of the lagoon, within the current airport area, and to the north-east, at Portegrandi, close to the edge of the lagoon.

Excavations in the centre of the town in 1995–97 identified a large baths complex dated between the 1st and 3rd centuries. In the early 1990s an investigation of the layer below a town gate on a canal pushed back its dating, which was previously attributed to the Augustan period, to the first half of the 1st century BCE and brought to light the remains of an imposing foundation ceremony. The ancient bed of a navigable canal with moorings, which was an extension of the Siloncello canal (see below), was discovered in the layers below the area of the Augustan period. It traced back the creation of a systematic hydraulic plan of remediation for the delicate ecosystem by the lagoon to the first half of the 1st century BCE.

A 2000 systematic excavation of the cemeteries found more than 2000 tombs and an extraordinary number of funerary monuments, which makes Altinum a prime site for the study of funerary architecture and rituals in northern Italy in the Roman imperial period. The Augustan period was a period of big mausolea, especially for those of the baldachin type, which was derived from Aegean-Oriental models. Several sumptuous examples were found in the monumental cemetery by the Via Annia, where the ruling elite started to build their grandiose burials in the last decades of the 1st century BCE. In the 1st century CE they were replaced by numerous funerary enclosures along both fronts of this cemetery. They were sometimes aligned close to each other over a length of over 170 m (560 ft), with mausolea alternating with various types of funerary buildings and areas taken up only by tombs. Cylindrical and octagonal altars typical of Altinum's sculptural art were a recurrent decorative element in the enclosures. They were probably placed in pairs at their corners.

The southern tract of the Siloncello canal (see below) was blocked in the last decades of the 1st century CE to start the eastern expansion of the town. This is attested by the urban plan of the new Augustan neighbourhood.

In 2007 a team of geomorphologists from the University of Padua carried out a survey with visible and near-infrared (NIR) aerial photographs which were taken after a period of prolonged drought and developed a digital elevation model (DEM) to reconstruct the urban topography and the environmental setting of Altinum. NIR is highly sensitive to vegetation, and crop marks highlight archaeological features.

The crops were suffering from drought and were highly sensitive to the subsurface presence of stones, bricks or compacted soil. They were in different stages of ripening due to differences in the amount of water in the soil. This created lighter crop marks, which indicated stonework and revealed the outlines of buildings at least 40 cm below the surface. Darker marks indicated depressed features such as ditches and canals. To the south of the town centre there was a wide strip of riper crops which were growing above what used to be a canal. The survey covered an area of 100 hectares.

The map of the town was reconstructed in great detail, revealing the urban fabric and the waterways, the town walls and gates, the street network, and previously unknown neighbourhoods and buildings, including monumental ones: the amphitheatre, the theatre, the odeon, and the forum, which are attributable to the 1st century BCE and the 1st century CE. The town was on top of a 2-to-3 m-high (6.6-to-9.8 ft) mound, and in Roman times the lagoon shore probably reached the foot of that mound. Altinum was probably partially surrounded by water. The researchers conclude that the results indicate a complex urban system "adapted to the peculiarity of the lagoon environment" and show that "the Romans successfully exploited the amphibious environment several centuries before the city of Venice started to emerge."

The map of Altinum, which was reconstructed through remote sensing, can be seen overlaid on Google Earth.

The political and administrative heart of the town was in the northernmost part. Here, besides the outlines of the forum, amphitheatre, theatre and odeon, the outlines of the capitolium (the temple of the Capitoline Triad) and the basilica were also identified in the 2007 remote sensing survey. The theatre had a length of 120 m (390 ft) and a radius of 60 m (200 ft). It is dated between 40 and 20 BCE. It was one of the first ones in northern Italy and one of the first in a provincial town in the whole of Italy. The odeon was half its size. The amphitheatre was in the outskirts, to the north of the canal, which marked the northern limit of the town. Its longer axis was 150 m (490 ft), and its size was similar to that of the Arena di Verona (which could host 30,000 people) and was larger than those of Padua and Aquileia.

Between 2012 and 2015, Ca' Foscari University of Venice carried out surveys in an area in the east of the town, where in 2000 a geophysical survey indicated an urban area, roads and a building with an apse, which correspond to the area of the late Republic monumental town gate. In the 2007 survey it came out blurred. Between 1989 and 1990 there was a geophysical survey in this area and the one next to it to the east. A series of plinths along the main canal and a secondary canal, which branches from it were identified. This tallies with some 1972 samplings on the eastern bank of the secondary canal which found the foundations of a brick quay resting on wooden piling and seven rectangular plinths related to a big building which is identified as a warehouse. This suggests that it was a commercial area.

In 2012, just under half of the area was surveyed. It focused on surface finds (at a depth of 20 to 30 cm [7.9 to 11.8 in]). The area had been devoted to medicinal plants for years and had not been ploughed. It was on a marked mound. Pottery and architectural fragments, coins, fictile materials and other items were found. High concentrations of plaster, mosaic tesserae, and architectural and stone fragments indicate that there were buildings. The 2014 campaign covered the rest of the area and used the same methods. Electromagnetic prospections detected three northeast–southwest parallel gravel roads with an average length of c. 7 m (23 ft) and a road perpendicular to them along the northern edge of the area, which was parallel to the canal which marks the northern end of the town. Another structure with the same orientation was detected in the central area of the survey, but gravel was not detected, and it might have been a canal.

The finds of some concentrations of glass leftovers and fragments of a crucible suggest that there were glassworks. This is an important find because it could confirm the hypothesis that Altinum had a role in glass production in the Roman days.

== The port and the canals ==
The networks of ditches and canals discovered to the northwest, southwest and south of Altinum, the canals in the town, and the canals which connected the town to the lagoon show that Altinum needed to both connect its port to the lagoon and to create a hydraulic system to manage the delicate hydraulic and environmental setting of the marshy area it was in. This shaped the geomorphology of the town. Vitruvius gave some indication of the management needs in marshy areas, including Altinum, and Strabo indicated that the town had a system of canals (see above). Altinum was successful in managing its often waterlogged, marshy environment.

Altinum was crossed in the middle by a west–east main canal. An oblong, semi-circular canal marked the northern limit of the central part of the town, and a southern one marked the southern limit. These three canals reached the River Zero, to the west of the town. The Siloncello canal, which still exists, runs in a northeast–southwest oblique straight line from the River Sile. It came close to the northeastern edge of the town. A southward extension of this canal was connected to the three mentioned canals. It continued south of the town and reached the Santa Maria canal, which still exists and runs south of the town from the River Dese to the lagoon at the Palude di Cona marsh and thus connected the port, which was to the east of the extension canal, to the lagoon. The Siloncello canal turns east at a right angle just before the town and then south, reaching the Palude di Cona slightly further east. Thus, the port could be reached through the Siloncello from the east and the Santa Maria from the west.

The Siloncello canal also continued eastwards and reached the River Sile, close to its mouth. At the time the River Piave must have flowed into the Sile. The Piave was a preferred route for the transport of wood from the forests of Cadore towards Altinum, as attested by an inscription found in Feltre. Thus, this canal was of strategic importance for the supply of wood. The remains of a 192 m-long (630 ft) mooring dock on the western bank of the Siloncello was found in 1930 a few hundred metres north of the town.

A fluvial dock area was found between 1988 and 1993 on the west bank of a north–south canal that was aligned to the Siloncello canal. It had porticoed warehouses. The dock and the canal bed were below the urban structures of the Augustan urban period. In this period the canal was filled in.

A monumental town gate was built following the model of urban gates with a central body and angular towers. It has been dated to the first half of the 1st century BCE. It was richly decorated. The central body with the gate had two towers at each side. The structure was flanked on both sides by two short wall tracts attached to the towers. It rested on strong pilings made with oak trunks. It was on the canal that marked the northern boundary of the town. The canal was crossed, perhaps through two arches, by the cardus maximus. This canal is now only a ditch. It was shown in a 16th-century map. It still had a considerable width, was visible, and reached the River Zero in the late 19th century. It was the preferred route to take goods from the port to some presumed moorings at the northern border of the town and to the beginning of the Via Claudia Augusta.

In 1972 the foundation of a 16.3 m (53 ft) brick dock with fully curved arches linked to a large building was found close to the gate, on the eastern bank of a secondary canal which branched off the main one inside the urban area. Its materials are dated to the late 1st century BCE and the mid-1st century CE. The remains of an imposing complex of porticoed docks were found along the opposite bank of the canal in an electromagnetic survey. The results indicate that it stretched for an over 120 m (390 ft) angled course, which seems to faithfully follow the morphology of the canal, whose width was around 10 m (33 ft).

The foundations of another porticoed dock similarly linked to a large building were detected along the canal which marked the southern border of the town, whose bed was indicated by a considerable depression in the terrain in the mid-60s. It stretched eastwards immediately before the northern shoulder of the bridge which linked the Via Annia to the town. It is dated to the late Republic period. It was in a key position in the immediate vicinity of the southern entrance of the town and along a fluvial route which started from the port and must have gone through the Santa Maria canal. This canal was connected to it. It was also linked to the Via Annia. From here, goods could reach the inland markets overland via the Via Annia or by following a wide canal with wooden banks which flanked this road in the north.

== UNESCO World Heritage Site ==
The "Venice and her Lagoon" UNESCO World Heritage Site was established in 1987. It includes the Altinum archaeological area.

== See also ==
- National Archaeological Museum of Altino
