= Quarto d'Altino railway station =

Railway station in Quarto d'Altino, Veneto, Italy

Quarto d'Altino
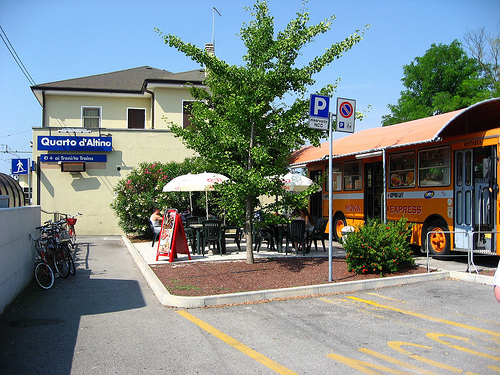
- Quarto d'Altino railway station

General information
- Location: Via Stazione 141, Quarto d'Altino, Veneto; Italy
- Coordinates: 45°34′28″N 12°21′53″E
- Owner: Rete Ferroviaria Italiana
- Operator: Trenitalia
- Line: Venice–Trieste railway
- Distance: 15.782 km (9.806 mi) from Venezia Santa Lucia
- Platforms: 3
- Tracks: 3

Other information
- Classification: Silver
Location
- Location within Veneto Location within Northern Italy Location within Italy

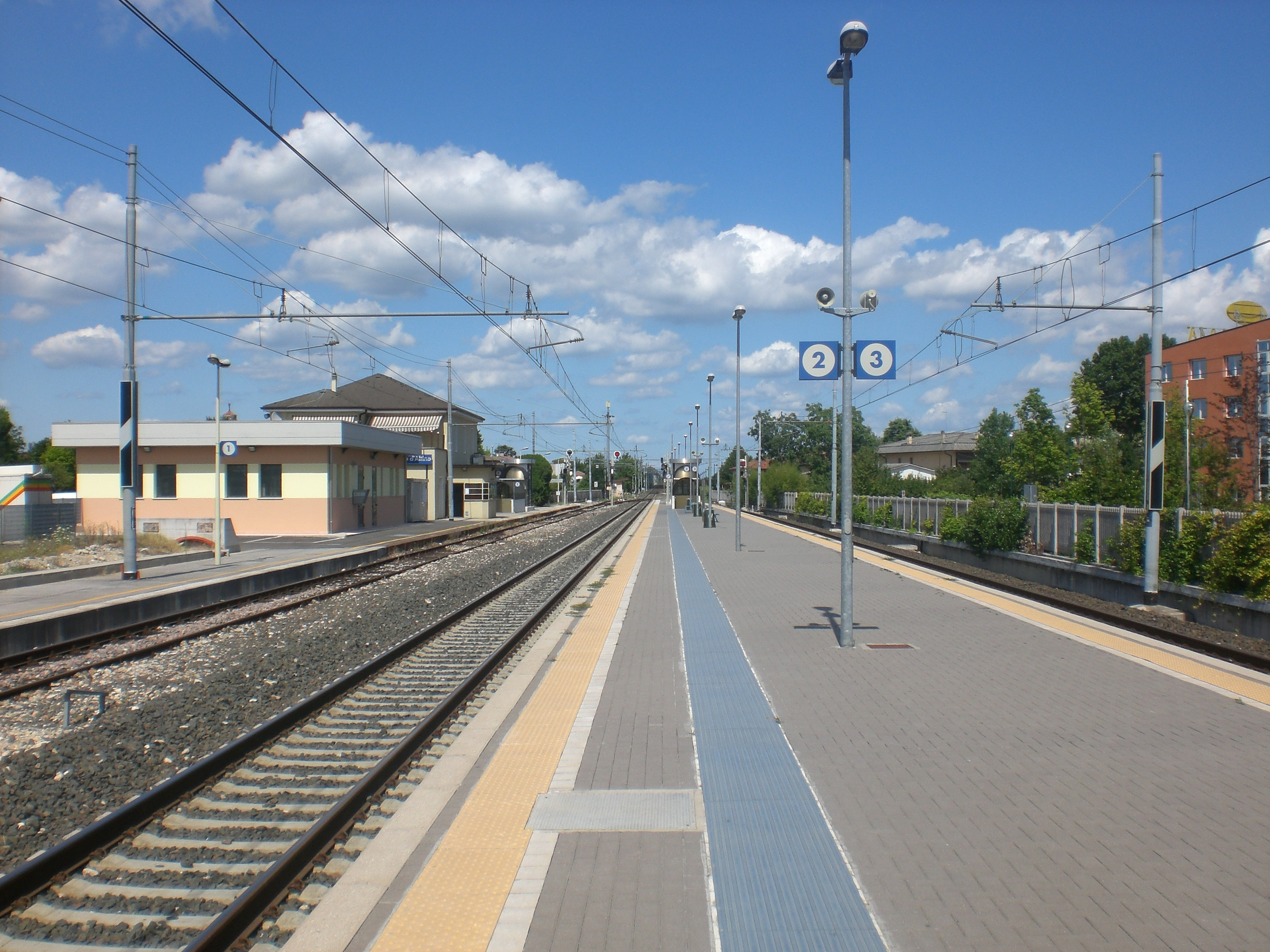
A view of the modernised platforms.

Quarto d'Altino (Italian: Stazione di Quarto d'Altino) is a railway station serving the town of Quarto d'Altino, in the region of Veneto, northern Italy. The station is located on the Venice–Trieste railway. The train services are operated by Trenitalia.

== History ==
In 1947 the stations name was changed from San Michele del Quarto to Quarto d'Altino.

== Modernisation ==
In the early 2000s the station was the subject of heavy work to platforms and the tracks in order to adapt it to modern standards: the pedestrian crossing over the track was replaced by a tunnel with lift, renovated lighting and signs and the passenger building was repainted. The ticket office was closed, replaced by automatic ticket machines, which have been criticized for their sometimes poor operation. The ticket machines were replaced in June 2009 with two more functional and multilingual ticket machines.

Despite these works, the modernisation is not yet complete, the waiting shelter (where the foundations were dug for) or the scheduled stop for buses have yet to be built. The small waiting room, where the ticket machines are located is not accessible for disabled people as opposed to the platforms.

In 2009 the capacity of the parking lot of 180 places was expanded with a new access roads.

== Train services ==
The station is served by the following service(s):

- Express services (Regionale Veloce) Venice - Portogruaro - Cervignano del Friuli - Trieste
- Express services ( Regionale Veloce ) Verona - Padua - Venice - Latisana
- Local services (Treno regionale) Venice - Portogruaro

== See also ==
- History of rail transport in Italy
- List of railway stations in Veneto
- Rail transport in Italy
- Railway stations in Italy
