= Via Annia =

The Via Annia was the Roman road in Venetia in north-eastern Italy. It run on the low plains of the lower River Po and of the lower Veneto and Friuli-Venezia Giulia regions, an area which had many rivers and large marsh areas and bordered the coastal lagoons. It linked Atria (modern Adria) to Aquileia, passing through Patavium (modern Padua). Then it got to the mainland coast of the Lagoon of Venice near today's Mestre and passed through Altinum. After this, it went through Iulia Concordia (modern Concordia Sagittaria), which was further inland. It was paved only through the main towns. The rest was gravelled. It was six to eighteen metre wide. It played an important part in the Romanization of the region.

== History ==
This road was built in the second half of the second century BCE by a magistrate who belonged to the gens Annia, either Titus Annius Luscus, consul in 153 BCE, who led the second column of soldiers to the colony of Aquileia or Titus Annius Rufus, praetor in 131 BCE. Besides the chronologic discrepancy, attributing the construction of the road to one or the other informs what conjecture is chosen for its southern end, Bononia (modern Bologna) for the former or Atria (modern Adria) for the latter. The second hypothesis maintains that the road was an extension of the Via Popilia (which connected Ariminum (modern Rimini) to Atria, linking it to Aquileia via Patavium and Altinum. This conjecture is based on archaeological traces and the Agna toponym. However, the Atria-to-Patavium tract is not mentioned in the 3rd and 4th century Roman itineraries, perhaps because its importance was a secondary one. Three itineraries indicate the staging posts (mansiones, plural of mansio) between Patavium and Aquileia. After Patavium the road reached the mansio of Ad Duodecimum, which has been identified with Sambruson del Dolo and then followed the mainland coast of the Lagoon of Venice with the mansiones of Ad Duodecimum, Ad Portum and Ad Nonum.

The road then reached the port town of Altinum, where there was a branch of the Via Claudia Augusta, which crossed the Alps and reached the limes on the River Danube in southern Germany. It then continued in parallel with the coastline and passed through Iulia Concordia where it intersected the Via Postumia. The Itinerarium Burdigalense indicated two staging posts after this town, mutatio Apicilia and Ad Undecimu. Some military milestones with inscriptions which referred to the Via Annia have been found along this tract. The Road ended at Aquileia, which originated as a fortress town to defend northern Italy from invasions from the northeast and the east. and developed into a trading town with an important fluvial port and which connected eastern Venetia with Istria, Iulia Emona (modern Ljubljana) and Noricum.

The mansiones between Patavium and Altinum could be reached through a route along the River Brenta. According to some scholars it was along the right bank, while others think that it was along the left bank. This disagreement is due to differences in the distances given between Padua and Altino along the Via Annia. Four milestones have been found in this tract of the road. They were set up by emperors over time, long after the road was built. More have been found in Stanga, in the outskirts of Padua, Sambruson, just before the Lagoon of Venice, Campalto, by the lagoon, and near Altinum. Many emperors and their armies travelled along this road in the 6th century CE to defend the eastern boundary of the Empire. Their names were recorded on five milestones found along the Musile di Piave–Ceggia tract, to the east of Altinum, which crossed an ancient branch of the River Piave. The foundations of a three-arched-Roman bridge can still be seen where the road crossed an ancient branch of the Piave. Two piers and a number of three-arched sandstone bridgeheads that crossed a now extinct tract Canalat or Old Piavon River can be seen south of Ceggia. Further east the road crossed the River Livenza at Santa Anastasia where the ruins of a bridge became visible in the last century. To reach Iulia Concordia, the road had to cross a marsh as the town at the time was an island in this marsh at the northern extremity o the Lagoon of Caorle.

The road needed frequent maintenance because of flooding, the marshy environments and the ever–changing coastal hydrography. The stretch from Porto Menai, Altinum and to south of Musile di Piave was on raised land because the area was prone to floods. The road was on causeways raised above the level of the marshes through stretches of marshland in the lower valley of the Po. The abutments of several stone bridges have been found. One passed over the Grassaga canal and was discovered in 1922. Another passed over the former riverbed of the Bidoggia. Some sections of the road never fell out of use. Others became so thoroughly lost they have only been precisely identified with the development of aerial photography. One such stretch of the Via Annia is that passing through San Donà di Piave.

The road was abandoned because of the accumulation of alluvial deposits and the expansion of marshes covered the road in various tracts and because of a population decrease in the area due to the Barbarian invasions.
