= Pietro Sforzin =

Italian footballer

Personal information
- Date of birth: 6 December 1919
- Place of birth: Ceggia, Italy
- Date of death: 18 February 1986 (aged 66)
- Place of death: Padua, Italy
- Position: Defender

Senior career*
Years	Team	Apps	(Gls)
1938–1939	Dopolavoro Ceggia		
1939–1942	Padova	89	(1)
1942–1943	Juventus	5	(0)
1943–1951	Padova	206	(2)
1951–1953	Verona	34	(3)
- * Club domestic league appearances and goals

Pietro Sforzin (6 December 1919 – 18 February 1986) was an Italian professional football player.
