= Quarto d'Altino =

- Comune
- Comune di Quarto d'Altino
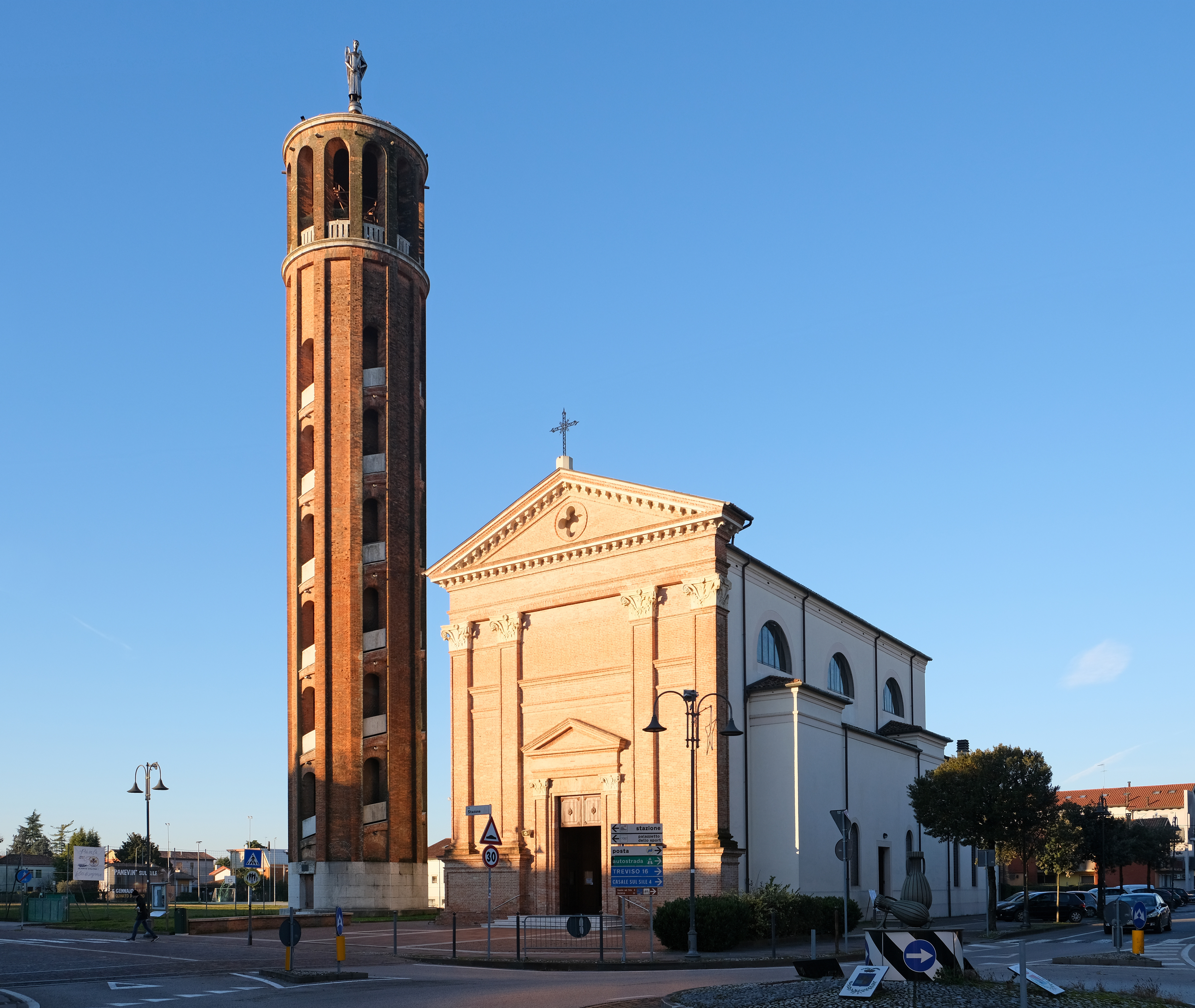

- Location within Italy Location within Veneto
- Coordinates: 45°35′N 12°22′E
- Country: Italy
- Region: Veneto
- Metropolitan city: Venice (VE)
- Frazioni: Altino, Portegrandi Località: Le Crete, San Michele Vecchio, Trepalade, Trezze

Government
  - Mayor: Claudio Grosso

Area
  - Total: 28.33 km^{2} (10.94 sq mi)
- Elevation: 4 m (13 ft)

Population (31 March 2017)
  - Total: 8,110
  - Density: 286/km^{2} (741/sq mi)
- Demonym: Altinati
- Time zone: UTC+1 (CET)
  - Summer (DST): UTC+2 (CEST)
- Postal code: 30020
- Dialing code: 0422
- Patron saint: San Michele Arcangelo
- Website: Official website

Quarto d'Altino is a town in the Metropolitan City of Venice, Veneto, Italy.

The name "Quarto D'Altino" is composed by the prefix "Quarto" because the town was a quarter of a mile from the Roman city Altinum.

== Transportation ==
SP41 provincial road goes through it. The town is served by the Quarto d'Altino railway station.
