= Ceggia =

- Comune
- Comune di Ceggia
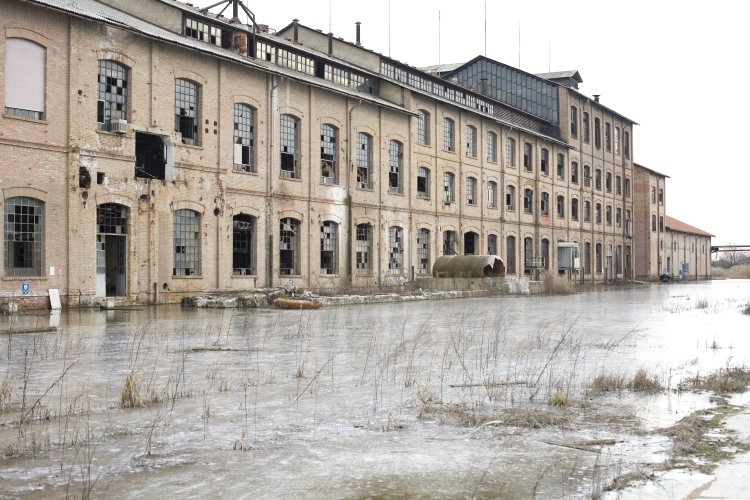
- Former sugar plant.

- Location within Italy Location within Veneto
- Coordinates: 45°41′N 12°38′E
- Country: Italy
- Region: Veneto
- Metropolitan city: Venice (VE)
- Frazioni: Gainiga, Pra di Levada, Rivazancana

Government
  - Mayor: Mirko Marin

Area
  - Total: 22.1 km^{2} (8.5 sq mi)
- Elevation: 3 m (9.8 ft)

Population (31 March 2017)
  - Total: 6,129
  - Density: 277/km^{2} (718/sq mi)
- Demonym: Ciliensi
- Time zone: UTC+1 (CET)
  - Summer (DST): UTC+2 (CEST)
- Postal code: 30022
- Dialing code: 0421
- Patron saint: St. Vitalis
- Website: Official website

Ceggia is a town in the Metropolitan City of Venice, in Veneto, northern Italy, known for its carnival. It is crossed by the SP58 provincial road and the SS14 state road.

== History ==
=== The origins ===
The name "Ceggia" derives from the Latin Cilia maris or Cilium maris, which in each case means "sea shore". In ancient times Ceggia was therefore a village on the shores of the Adriatic. The nucleus of the town was formed slightly later than the hamlet of Gainiga, where finds of Roman origin were found which testify to life in these lands (in fact the Via Annia passed here, built by Tito Annio Lusco in 153 BC, which still follows via Colonne and via Anarè). Many Roman objects have been found in the town of Gainiga (coins, amphorae, refreshment points) which suggests this peripheral area was very popular in the past, compared to the center of the town. Also in Ceggia were found the Roman bridge, still exposed in its original place, a funerary stele, found by chance by a farmer on via Noghera while he was tilling the land in the 1980s, various Roman coins, some amphorae, exposed at the crossroads of SS14, and a marble stone of Roman origin, found during the construction of the (now abandoned) military base.

=== Medieval period ===
With the end of the Roman period, in Ceggia there was progressive deterioration of the works built by the Romans, as in all the surrounding areas. With the barbarian and Lombard invasions, the land slowly sank and the sea advanced. It was the Lombards who gave the name "Gainiga" to the center near Ceggia: in fact, in 998, in an imperial decree, the toponym Gaieniga is found, coming from the word Gahagi, meaning "wood, hedge". Even the toponym "Rivazancana" is from this period: in 1024, in the Cittanova pact, we find Rivo cancani, originating from the German term zanka (earthenware).

=== Renaissance ===
In 1317 Ceggia appears to be present in the inventory of the properties of the Da Camino family of Oderzo, while in 1389 it became part of the Serenissima Republic of Venice . In these times a first chapel was built in San Vitale. Many noble Venetian families also arrived in this period, such as the Loredans and the Zenos, who had a villa designed by Andrea Palladio built. But in 1797 Napoleon's conquests brought down the Republic of Venice, so Ceggia and the rest of the Veneto found themselves part of the Austrian government.

== Notable people ==
- Pietro Sforzin (1919-1986), professional footballer
