= Saufeia gens =

Ancient Roman family

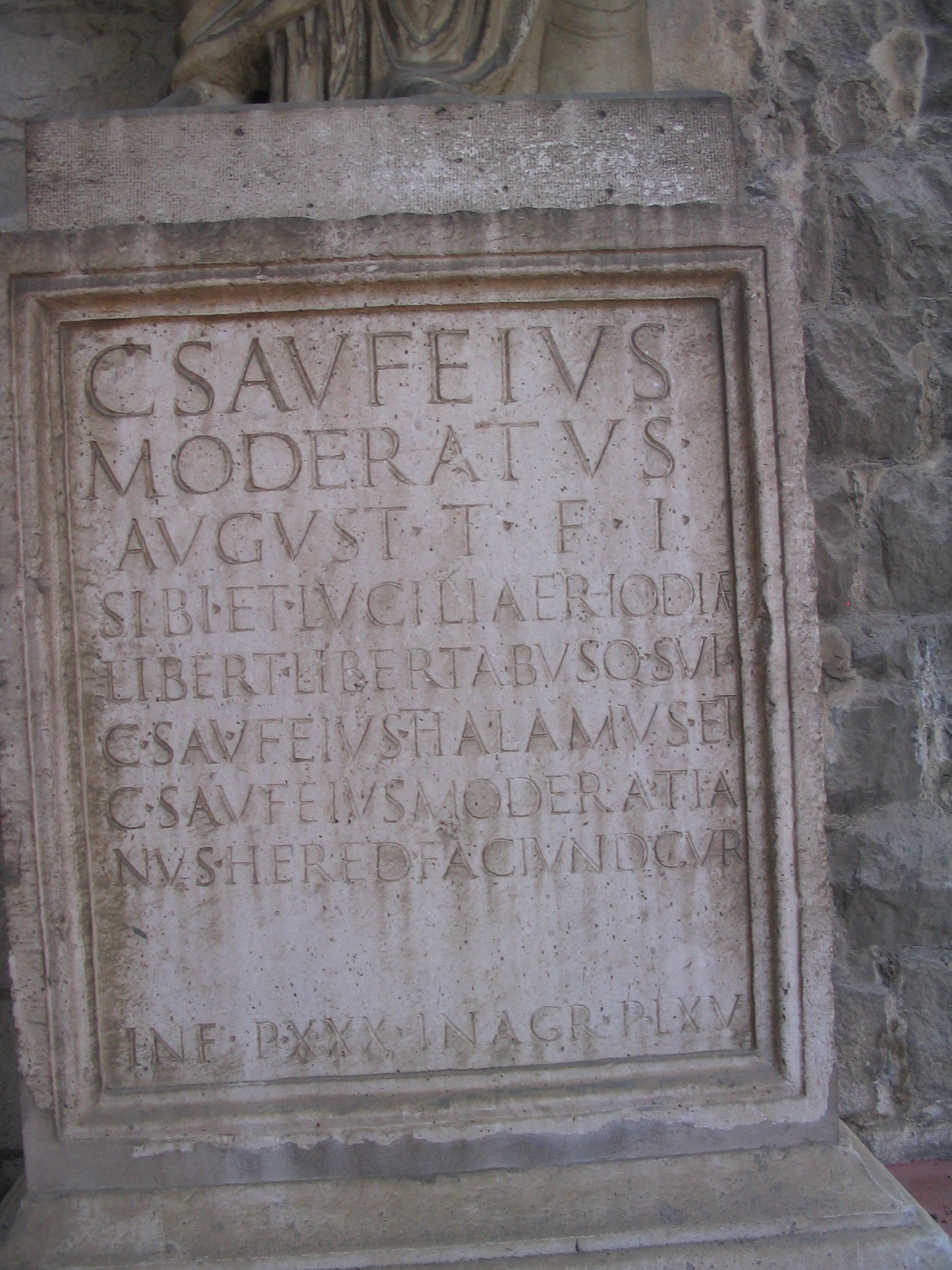
Monument of Gaius Saufeius Moderatus and his wife, Lucilia Herodia, at Salona. Dedicated by their sons, Gaius Saufeius Thalamus and Gaius Saufeius Moderatianus.

The gens Saufeia was a minor plebeian family at ancient Rome. Members of this gens are first mentioned in the final century of the Republic, and from then to the early Empire their name occurs regularly in history, but none of them ever attained the consulship.

== Origin ==
The nomen Saufeius belongs to a large class of gentilicia formed using the suffix -eius, the majority of which were of Oscan derivation.

== Praenomina ==
The Saufeii used a variety of praenomina, some of which were very common, such as Gaius, Lucius, and Marcus, while others were quite distinctive, like Appius and Decimus.

== Members ==
- Lucius Saufeius, triumvir monetalis in 152 BC, minted denarii, aes, and fractional coins. His denarii bear the head of Roma upon the obverse, and Victoria driving a biga on the reverse.
- Gaius Saufeius, elected quaestor for 99 BC, espoused the cause of the tribune Lucius Appuleius Saturninus, and was taken into custody along with Saturninus and many of his supporters, who were then stoned to death with roof tiles.
- Saufeius, tribune of the plebs in 91 BC, authored an agrarian law known as the lex Saufeia, establishing a commission of five men, including his colleague, the reformer Marcus Livius Drusus, to redistribute agricultural land.
- Marcus Saufeius, a companion of Titus Annius Milo, who participated in the fracas that ended with the murder of Publius Clodius Pulcher in 52 BC. He was twice tried for his role in the affair, and successfully defended by Cicero.
- Lucius Saufeius, an eques whose property was seized by the triumvirs. With the aid of his friend and ally, Titus Pomponius Atticus, his property was restored. Cicero describes him as a follower of Epicureanism.
- Appius Saufeius, mentioned by Pliny as an example of sudden death; on his return from the bath, he drank some honeyed wine and water, and swallowed an egg, whereupon he expired.
- Decimus Saufeius, another example of sudden death mentioned by Pliny; he died while taking breakfast in his house.
- Saufeius Trogus, one of those put to death in AD 48 for having aided the empress Messalina and Gaius Silius in their scandalous marriage.
- Saufeia, apparently a priestess of the Bona Dea, whose immodest sexual desires and drunkenness in connection with the rites of that goddess are twice mentioned by Juvenal. Perhaps the same Saufeia who sought to tryst with Martial, but not to be seen in her bath.

== See also ==
- List of Roman gentes

== Bibliography ==
- Marcus Tullius Cicero, Epistulae ad Atticum, Pro Gaio Rabirio Perduellionis Reo.
- Lucius Annaeus Seneca (Seneca the Younger), Apocolocyntosis Divi Claudii (The Gourdification of the Divine Claudius).
- Quintus Asconius Pedianus, Commentarius in Oratio Ciceronis Pro Milone (Commentary on Cicero's Oration Pro Milone).
- Gaius Plinius Secundus (Pliny the Elder), Historia Naturalis (Natural History).
- Publius Cornelius Tacitus, Annales.
- Appianus Alexandrinus (Appian), Bellum Civile (The Civil War).
- Joseph Hilarius Eckhel, Doctrina Numorum Veterum (The Study of Ancient Coins, 1792–1798).
- Dictionary of Greek and Roman Biography and Mythology, William Smith, ed., Little, Brown and Company, Boston (1849).
- George Davis Chase, "The Origin of Roman Praenomina", in Harvard Studies in Classical Philology, vol. VIII, pp. 103–184 (1897).
- T. Robert S. Broughton, The Magistrates of the Roman Republic, American Philological Association (1952–1986).
- Michael Crawford, Roman Republican Coinage, Cambridge University Press (1974, 2001).
