= Scaptia gens =

Ancient Roman family

The gens Scaptia was a minor plebeian family at ancient Rome. Few members of this gens are mentioned in history, but they gave their name to the Scaptian tribe, established in 332 BC.

== Praenomina ==
The Scaptii used a variety of common praenomina, including Gaius, Marcus, Lucius, Publius, and Quintus, all of which were among the most common names throughout all periods of Roman history, as well as the more distinctive Manius, and at least one instance of Statia, an Oscan praenomen sometimes found among freedwomen at Rome, but in this case belonging to a woman in one of the Spanish provinces, who was evidently born free, perhaps descended from a Sabine or Samnite family that had settled in Spain.

== Members ==
This list includes abbreviated praenomina. For an explanation of this practice, see filiation.

- Publius Scaptius, said to have been the arbiter chosen to decide the ownership of land disputed between the people of Aricia and Ardea, in 466 BC. As a Roman, Scaptius was expected to be neutral, but he decided that the land in question should belong to Rome. Niebuhr suggested that Scaptius be regarded as a figure of folklore, since the land in question was probably included in the original allotment of the Scaptian tribe.
- Marcus Scaptius, a negotiator, or money-lender, in Cilicia, whom Appius Claudius Pulcher had appointed prefect of Salamis, and placed in charge of a cavalry troop, which Scaptius used to enforce his claims. Cicero considered this a scandalous grant of authority to a private citizen, notwithstanding the recommendation of Brutus, and canceled the appointment on becoming governor of Cilicia.
- Marcus Scaptius, appointed military tribune of Cappadocia by Cicero during his government of Cilicia.
- Scaptia M. l. Hilara, a freedwoman, and the wife of the freedman Marcus Ceppuleius Bito, with whom she was buried at Verteneglio in Venetia and Histria, in a tomb built by their son, Marcus Ceppuleius Pudens, dating to the late first century BC or early first century AD.
- Scaptia M'. f. Paulla, the wife of Tiberius Terentianus, was buried at Ephesus in Asia, together with her son-in-law, Lucius Cusinius, in a tomb built by her daughter, Claudia Firmilla, some time in the first half of the first century AD.
- Lucius Scaptius Primus, dedicated a tomb dating to the reign of Nero at the present site of Tresigallo, formerly part of Venetia and Histria, to his wife, Gellia Urbana, and Gaius Trebius Anteros, a freedman.
- Manius Scaptius Q. f. Pius, buried at Ephesus, in a tomb dating to the latter half of the first century AD.
- Scaptia, dedicated a tomb at Rome to her daughter, Atticilla, aged twenty.
- Scaptia M. f., named in an inscription from Saturnia in Etruria.
- Gaius Scaptius C. f. Atticus, buried in a family sepulchre at Bonna in Germania Inferior.
- Gaius Scaptius Nucerinus, buried at Bonna.
- Statia Scaptia L. f. Phia, buried at Carthago Nova in Hispania Citerior.
- Scaptia Phyllis, buried at Bonna.
- Scaptia Prisca, buried at Bonna.

== See also ==
- List of Roman gentes

== Bibliography ==
- Marcus Tullius Cicero, Epistulae ad Atticum.
- Dionysius of Halicarnassus, Romaike Archaiologia.
- Titus Livius (Livy), History of Rome.
- Barthold Georg Niebuhr, The History of Rome, Julius Charles Hare and Connop Thirlwall, trans., John Smith, Cambridge (1828).
- Dictionary of Greek and Roman Biography and Mythology, William Smith, ed., Little, Brown and Company, Boston (1849).
- Theodor Mommsen et alii, Corpus Inscriptionum Latinarum (The Body of Latin Inscriptions, abbreviated CIL), Berlin-Brandenburgische Akademie der Wissenschaften (1853–present).
- René Cagnat et alii, L'Année épigraphique (The Year in Epigraphy, abbreviated AE), Presses Universitaires de France (1888–present).
- Antonio Minto, Saturnia Etrusca e Romana, Rome (1925).
- Inscriptiones Italiae (Inscriptions from Italy), Rome (1931-present).
- T. Robert S. Broughton, The Magistrates of the Roman Republic, American Philological Association (1952–1986).
- Inschriften Griechischer Städte aus Kleinasien (Inscriptions from the Greek Cities of Asia Minor, abbreviated IK), Bonn (1973–present).
