= Padua metropolitan area =

The Padua metropolitan area, located in Veneto, Italy, is the urban agglomeration surrounding the city of Padua.

Established as the metropolitan conference of Padua (Act No. 37, 25 March, 2003), It is not yet recognised by the Italian Republic as one of the città metropolitane (metropolitan cities) that will be instituted to replace province.

Nevertheless It is considered a significant parts of the Venetian metropolitan area around Venice.

== Metropolitan area ==
The Paduan metropolitan area is composed of the city of Padua and 15 towns from the Province of Padua, and one town from the Province of Venice, for a total of 394,011 inhabitants at the 2001 census, on a surface of 375.94 km^{2}, as shown in the following table (all data are referred to 2001 census):

Province	Town	Surface (km^{2})	Population	Veneto
Province of Padua	Padua	92.85	214,125
Province of Padua	Abano Terme	21.57	19,868
Province of Padua	Albignasego	20.99	26,006
Province of Padua	Cadoneghe	12.85	16,176
Province of Padua	Casalserugo	15.52	5,525
Province of Padua	Legnaro	14.89	8,594
Province of Padua	Limena	15.04	7,912
Province of Padua	Maserà di Padova	17.54	8,226
Province of Padua	Mestrino	19.30	9,211
Province of Padua	Noventa Padovana	7.17	10,941
Province of Padua	Ponte San Nicolò	13.50	12,656
Province of Padua	Rubano	14.56	16,631
Province of Padua	Saonara	13.52	10,531
Province of Padua	Selvazzano Dentro	19.58	22,305
Province of Padua	Vigodarzere	19.91	13,066
Province of Padua	Vigonza	33.32	20,421
Province of Padua	Villafranca Padovana	23.83	10,545
Province of Venice	Vigonovo	12.79	9,896
TOTAL (at 2021)		375.94	442,635
