= Province of Padua =

Province of Italy, located in the Veneto region

Coordinates: 45°24′23″N 11°52′40″E

Province of Padua Provincia di Padova (Italian) Provincia de Pàdova (Venetian) Provincia de Pàdoa (Venetian)
- Province
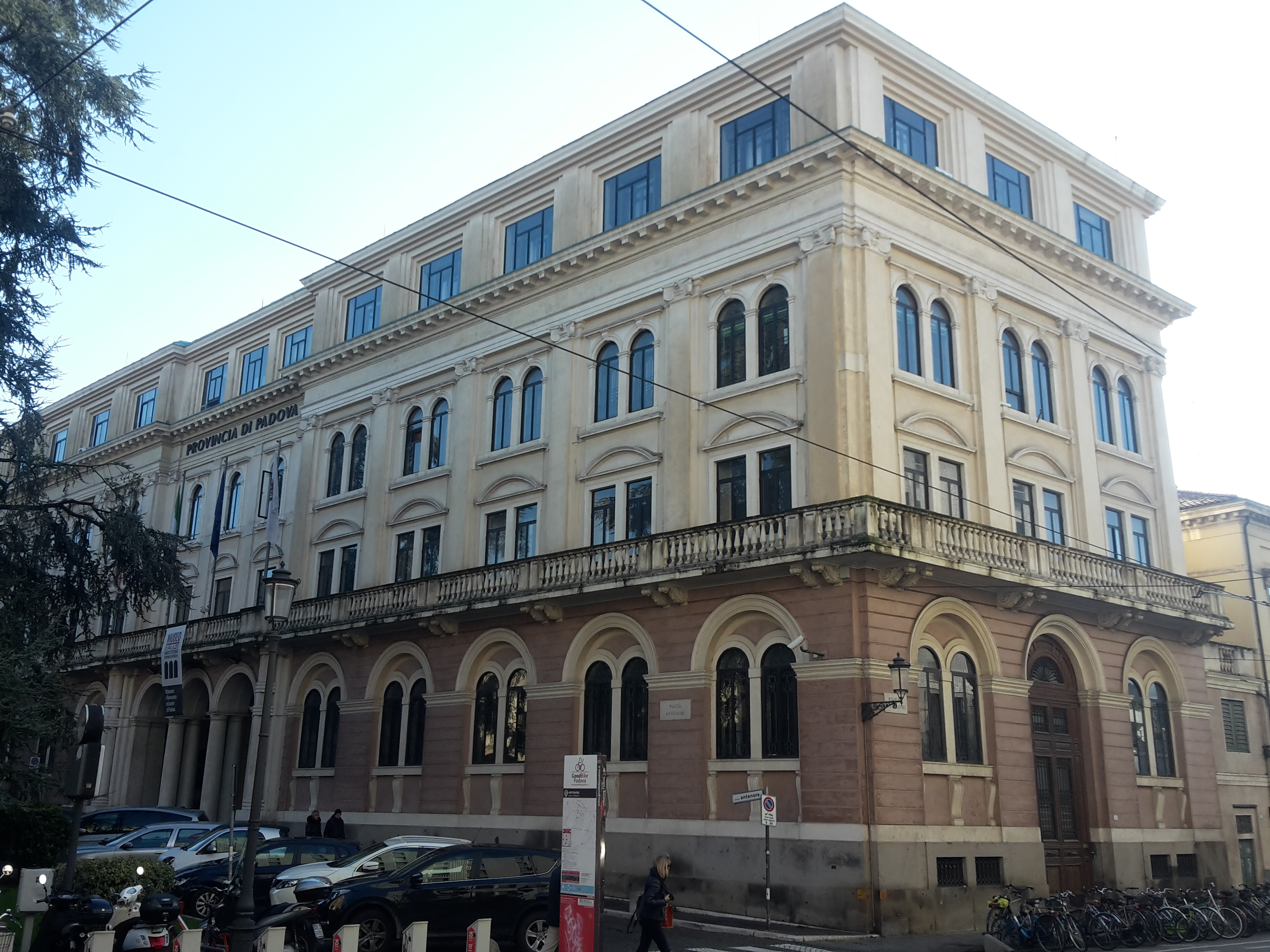
- Palazzo Santo Stefano, the provincial seat

- Flag Coat of arms

- Location of the province of Padua in Italy
- Country: Italy
- Region: Veneto
- Capital(s): Padua
- Municipalities: 101

Government
  - President: Daniele Canella (Liga Veneta–Lega)

Area
  - Total: 2,144.15 km^{2} (827.86 sq mi)

Population (2026)
  - Total: 934,540
  - Density: 435.86/km^{2} (1,128.9/sq mi)

GDP
  - Total: €30.146 billion (2015)
  - Per capita: €32,153 (2015)
- Time zone: UTC+1 (CET)
  - Summer (DST): UTC+2 (CEST)
- Postal code: 35010-35032, 35034-35038, 35040-35048
- Telephone prefix: 049, 0425, 0429
- Vehicle registration: PD
- ISTAT code: 028

The province of Padua (Italian: provincia di Padova, Venetian: Provincia de Pàdova / Provincia de Pàdoa) is a province in the region of Veneto in Italy. Its capital is the city of Padua. It has a population of 934,540 in an area of 2,144.15 square kilometres (827.86 sq mi) across its 101 municipalities.

== History ==
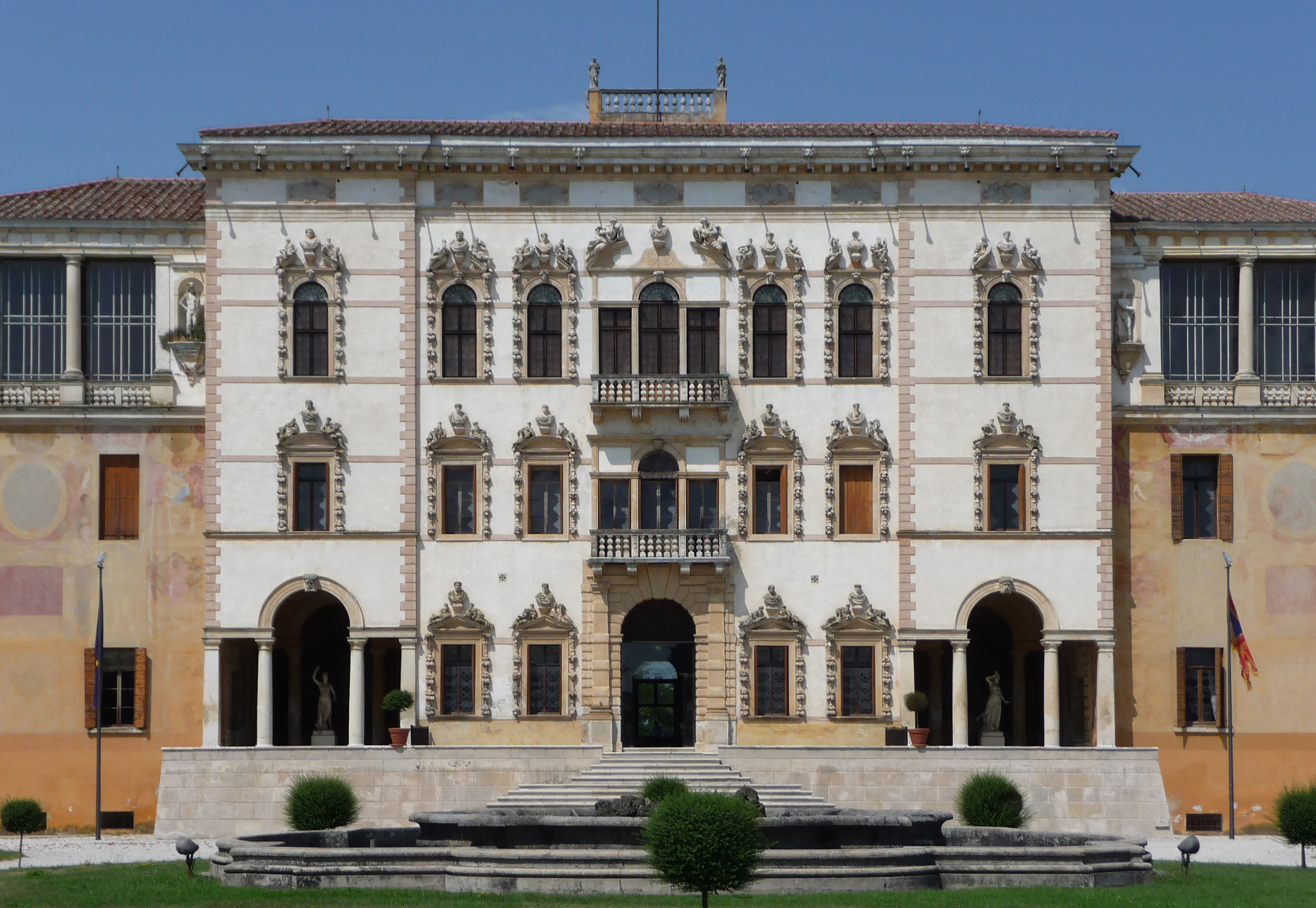
Villa Contarini

The borders of the province are almost the same of the Medieval commune of Padua, with just some adjustment in the north-east. The territory was administered within these boundaries since the time of the Republic of Venice, but the modern province comes directly from the administrative divisions of Kingdom of Lombardy–Venetia. The Diocese of Padua covers the most part of the province, out of a main part of alta pianura; instead it includes areas from the surrounding provinces.

== Geography ==
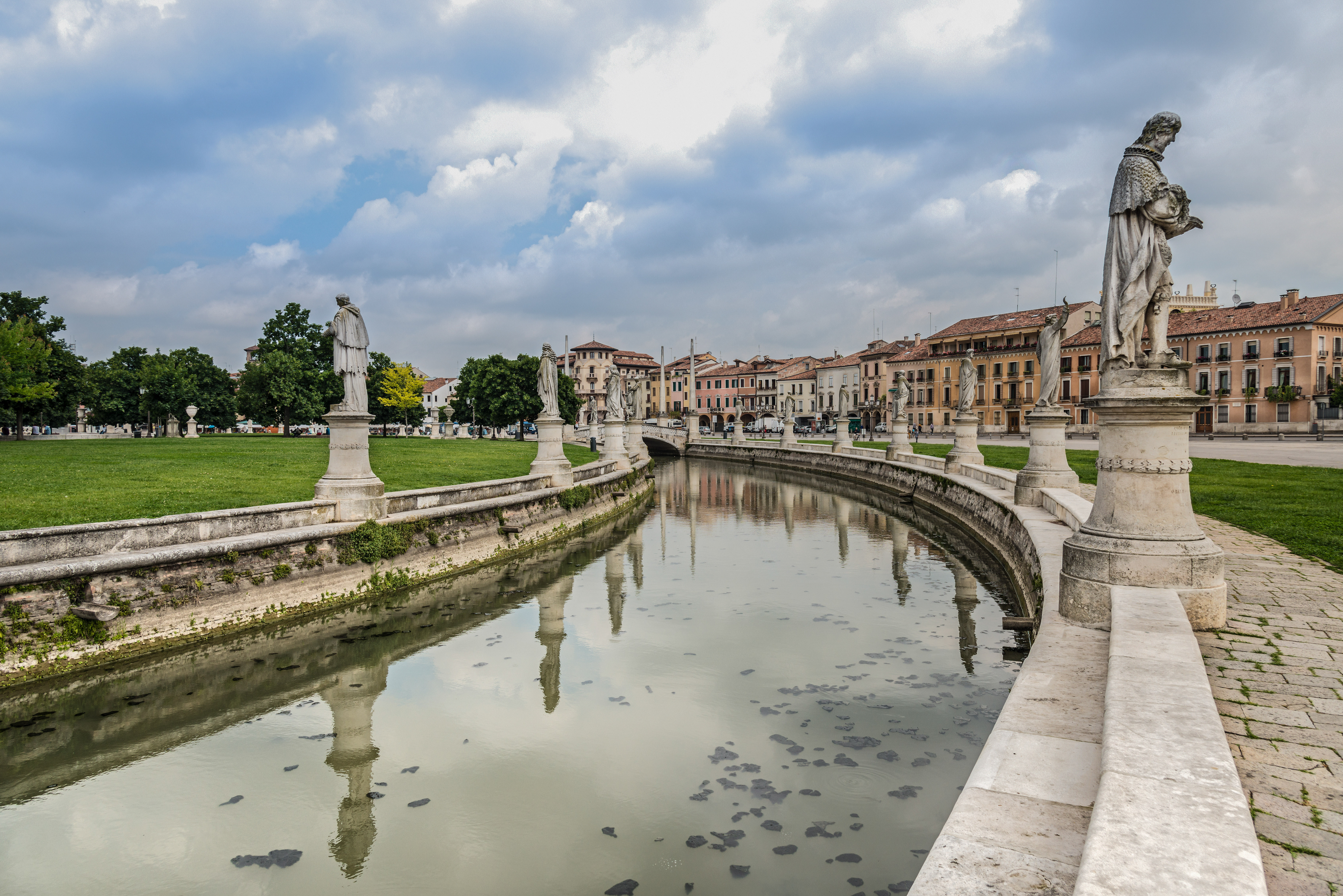
Prato della Valle in Padua

It has an area of 2,142 km^{2}, and a total population of 936,492 (2016) making it the most populated province of Veneto. There are 102 comuni in the province.

The territory is usually divided in the capital city, Padua, and its hinterland, formed by the nearby municipalities; the alta pianura ("higher plain"), north of the city; the bassa pianura ("lower plain"), south of the city, including the Saccisica in the south-east; and the Colli Euganei ("Euganei hills") south-west of the city. The Euganei hills are the only heights of the entire province, the other parts being totally plain.

== Climate ==
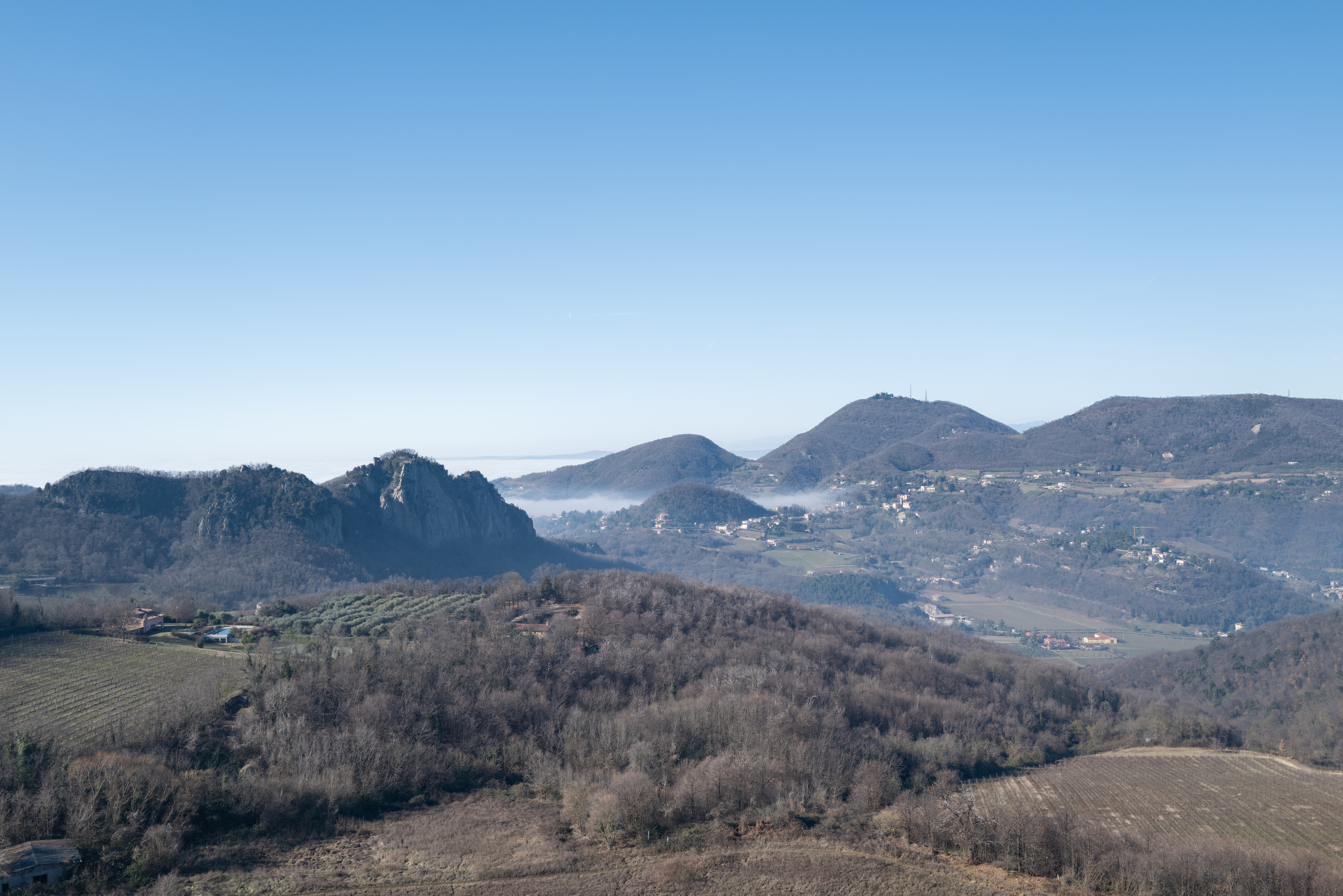
Colli Euganei

The most part of the province has a temperate sub-continental climate for the Köppen climate classification Cfa); only part of the Colli Euganei have a milder climate, because their southern slopes are above the thermal inversion line by winter, and exposed to the Sun all the year: which allows them to cultivate small olive trees.

The winter is usually moderately cold in the province, avoiding both warm and cold extremes; frost is very common at plain (below the thermal inversion line) with about 60–70 frost days a year, and temperatures usually do not get lower than −8/−12 °C in the plains during the year; but the all-times record for Padua is −19.2 °C by January 1985. The lower plain is slightly colder than the higher plain; snowfalls are highly variable from year to year, and one could see winters with almost no snow as years with frequent snowfalls (Padua has a century average of almost 20 cm/8 in during a year). Fog is a common phenomenon, even lasting all the day long, above all in the lower plain.

Summers are moderately hot and wet, warmer and less rainy in the lower plain, while the higher plain is often hit by thunderstorms; Padua has a record of +39.8 °C by August 2003, and usually gets above +36 °C in a year.

Spring and autumn are changeable seasons, which may experience wintry or sultry weather, heavy rainfalls or pleasant sunny days. The period between April and June is usually the wettest one in a year.

Climate data for Padua
Month	Jan	Feb	Mar	Apr	May	Jun	Jul	Aug	Sep	Oct	Nov	Dec	Year
Mean daily maximum °C (°F)	5.7 (42.3)	8.8 (47.8)	13.1 (55.6)	17.5 (63.5)	22.4 (72.3)	26.0 (78.8)	28.4 (83.1)	27.9 (82.2)	24.5 (76.1)	18.8 (65.8)	11.5 (52.7)	6.5 (43.7)	17.6 (63.7)
Mean daily minimum °C (°F)	−1.4 (29.5)	0.5 (32.9)	3.5 (38.3)	7.4 (45.3)	11.6 (52.9)	15.3 (59.5)	17.5 (63.5)	16.9 (62.4)	13.8 (56.8)	8.8 (47.8)	3.7 (38.7)	−0.4 (31.3)	8.1 (46.6)
Average precipitation mm (inches)	71 (2.8)	56 (2.2)	66 (2.6)	69 (2.7)	79 (3.1)	89 (3.5)	64 (2.5)	79 (3.1)	58 (2.3)	66 (2.6)	86 (3.4)	64 (2.5)	850 (33.3)
Source: Intellicast

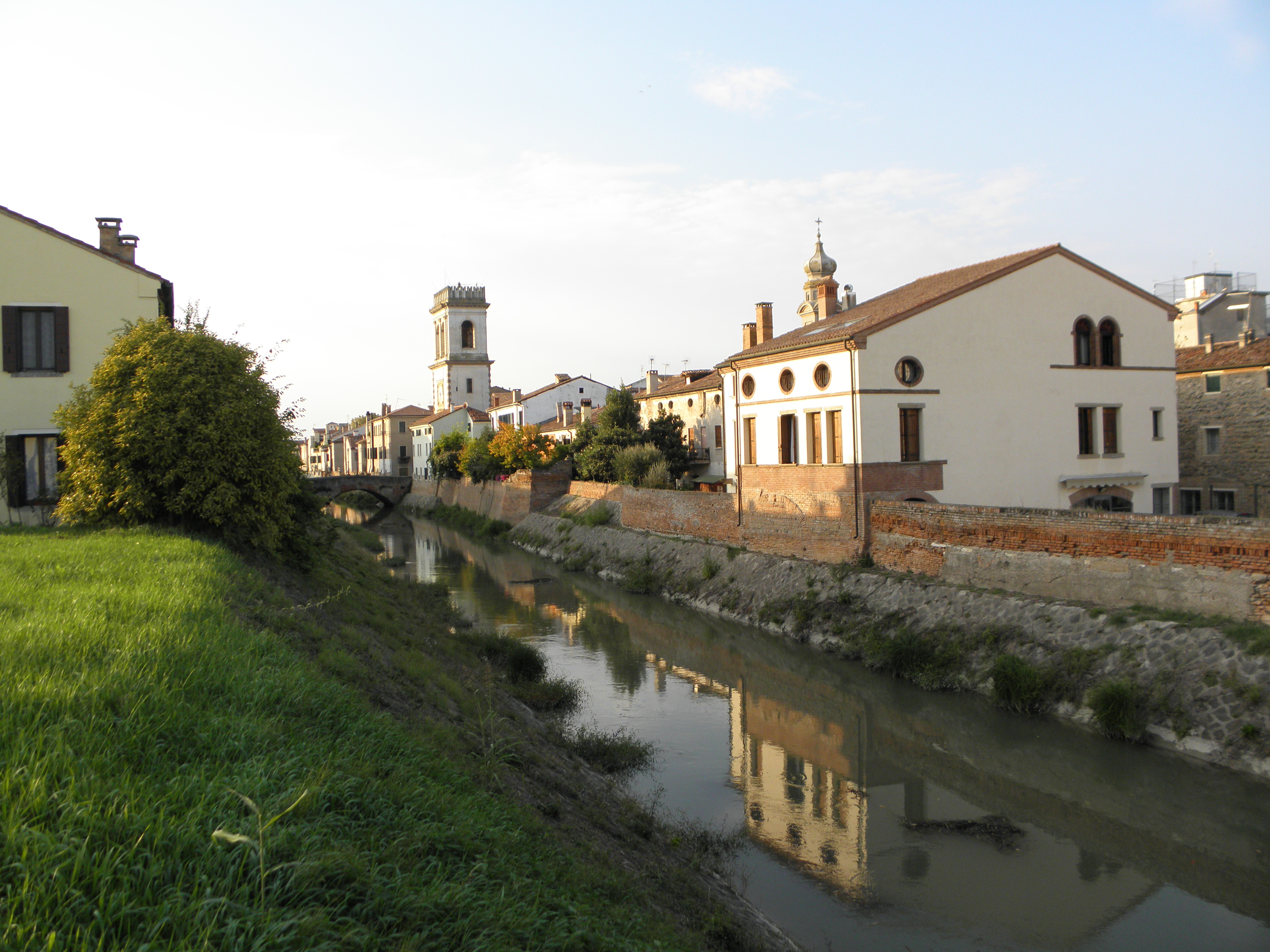
Canale Bisatto in Este

Extreme events may sometime hit the province. Flooding is a well-known phenomenon since ancient time, so that all the rivers and channels which cross the plain are embanked, and many channels were dug to avoid frequent flooding. The worst recent events were on 4 November 1966 and on 2 November 2010.

Snowstorms, with some inch of fresh snow and strong Bora gusts, may happen during a normal winter, but rarely can be considered like a blizzard, and usually they do not last more than 1–2 days and with no more than 6–10 in (15–25 cm) of snow. Anyway, a really exceptional event happened during the winter of 1608: a snowfall that lasted for 40 consecutive days, from late January to early March, with the snow depth at ground reaching at least 6–7 ft (about 2m) as witnessed by Galileo; a similar event never repeated.

Rarely, between May and September, tornadoes may hit the area as well. The most famous were the one of 17 August 1756, bringing heavy damages to Padua; and the one of 11 September 1970, starting from Colli Euganei and passing through Paduan metropolitan area to end over Venice, an F2 (intensifying up to F4 going onto Venice) on the Fujita scale. Hailstorms are possible as well by summer, the worst recent event having been on 28 August 2003.

=== Municipalities ===
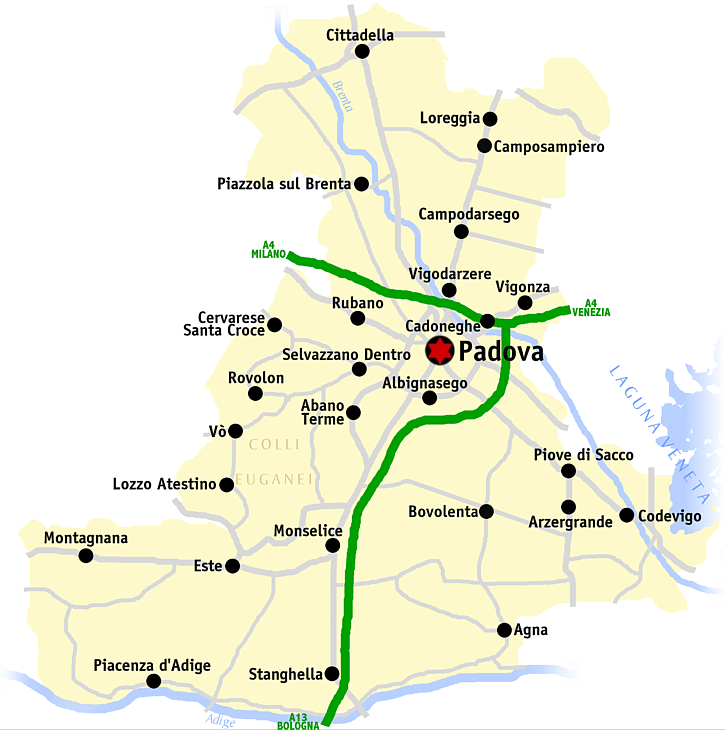
Map of the province of Padua

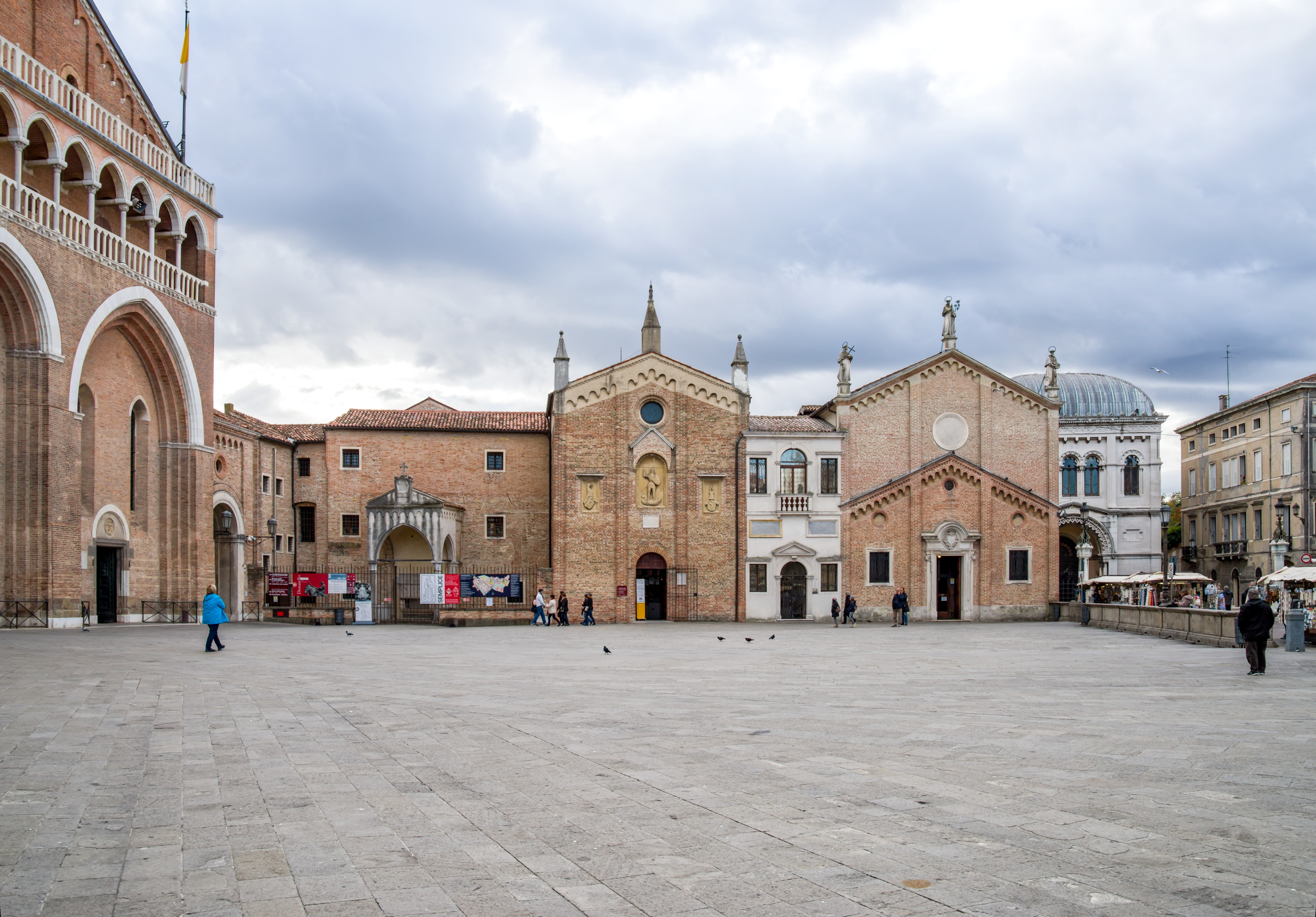
Padua

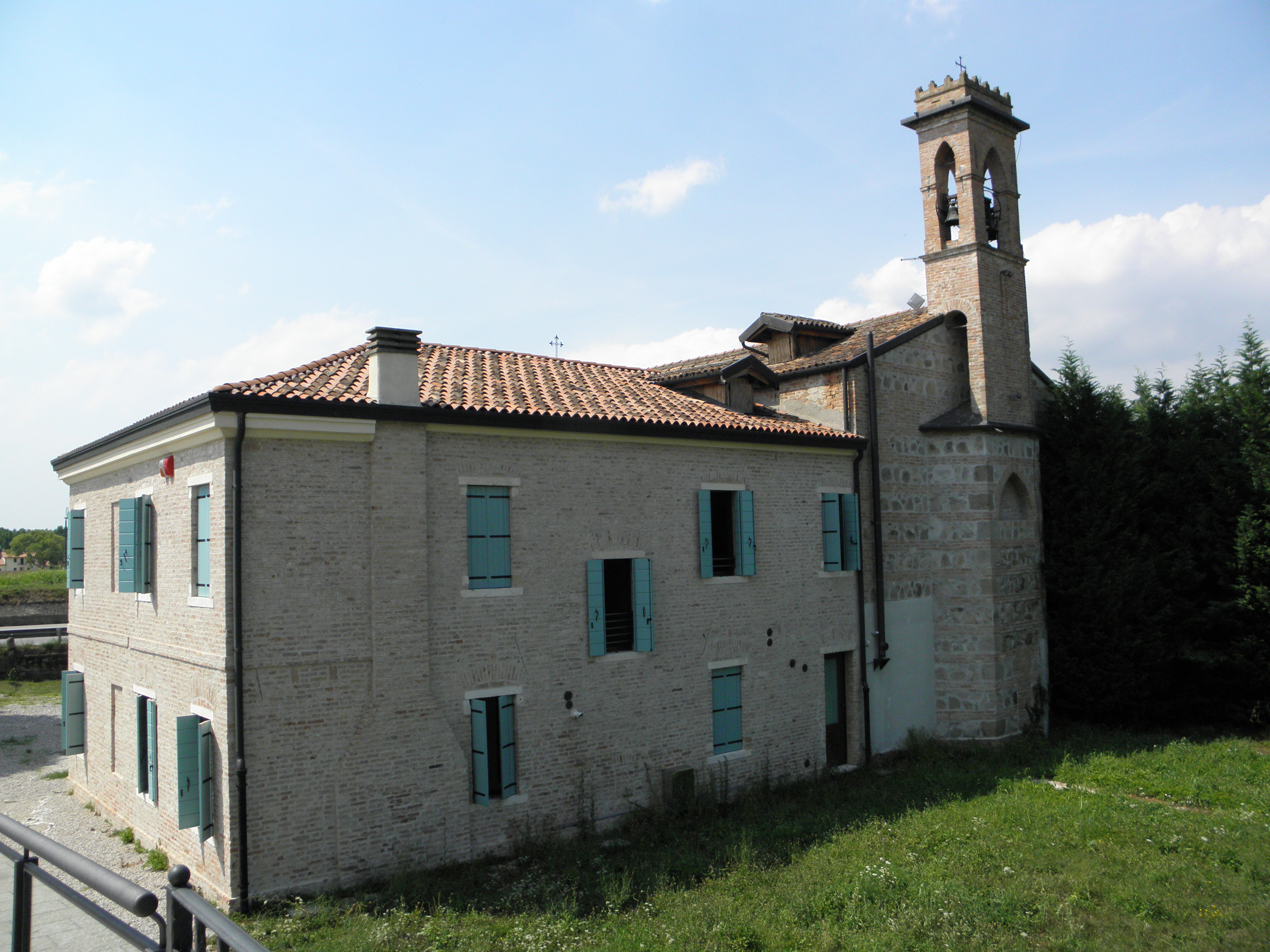
Albignasego

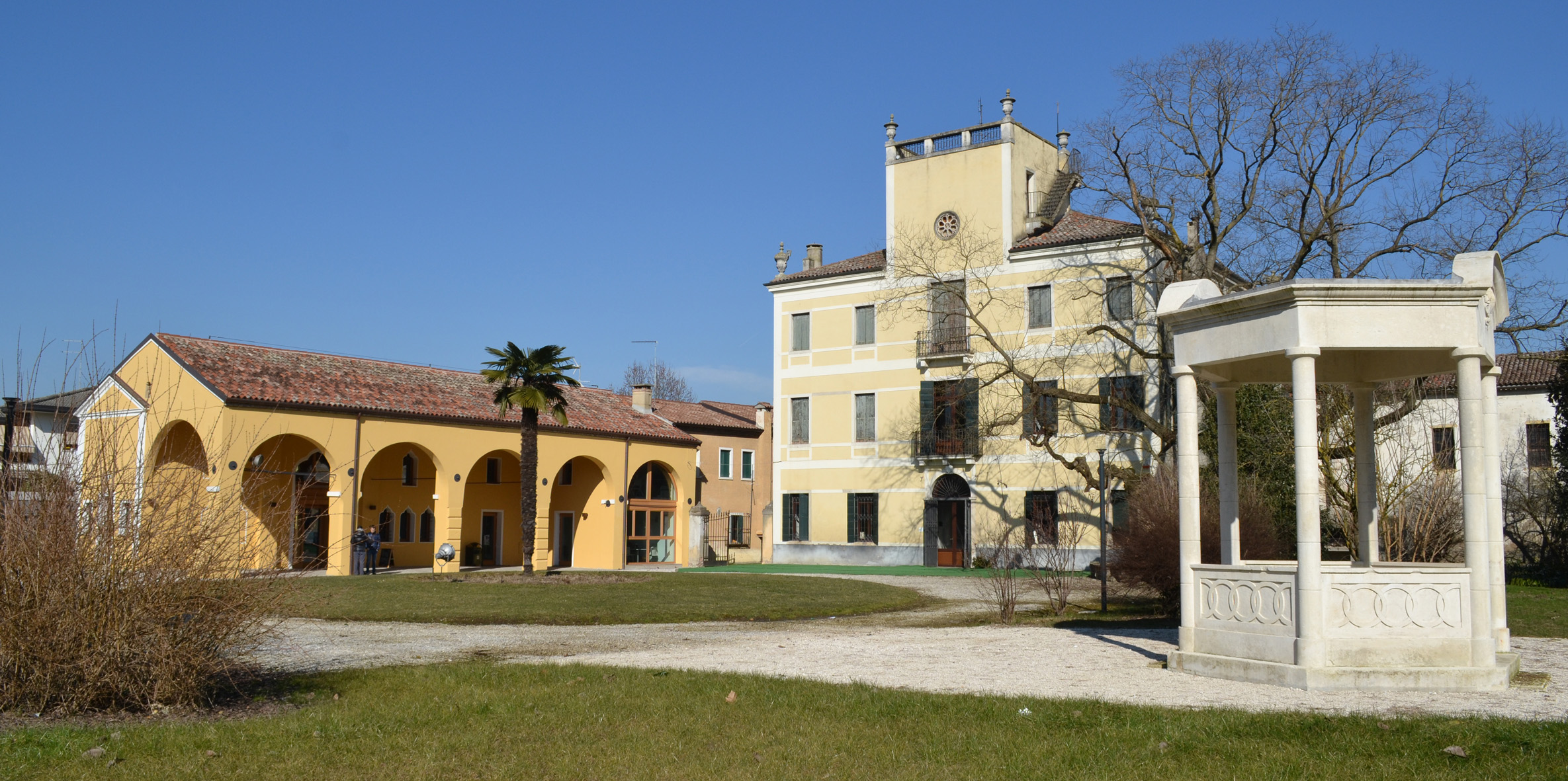
Selvazzano Dentro

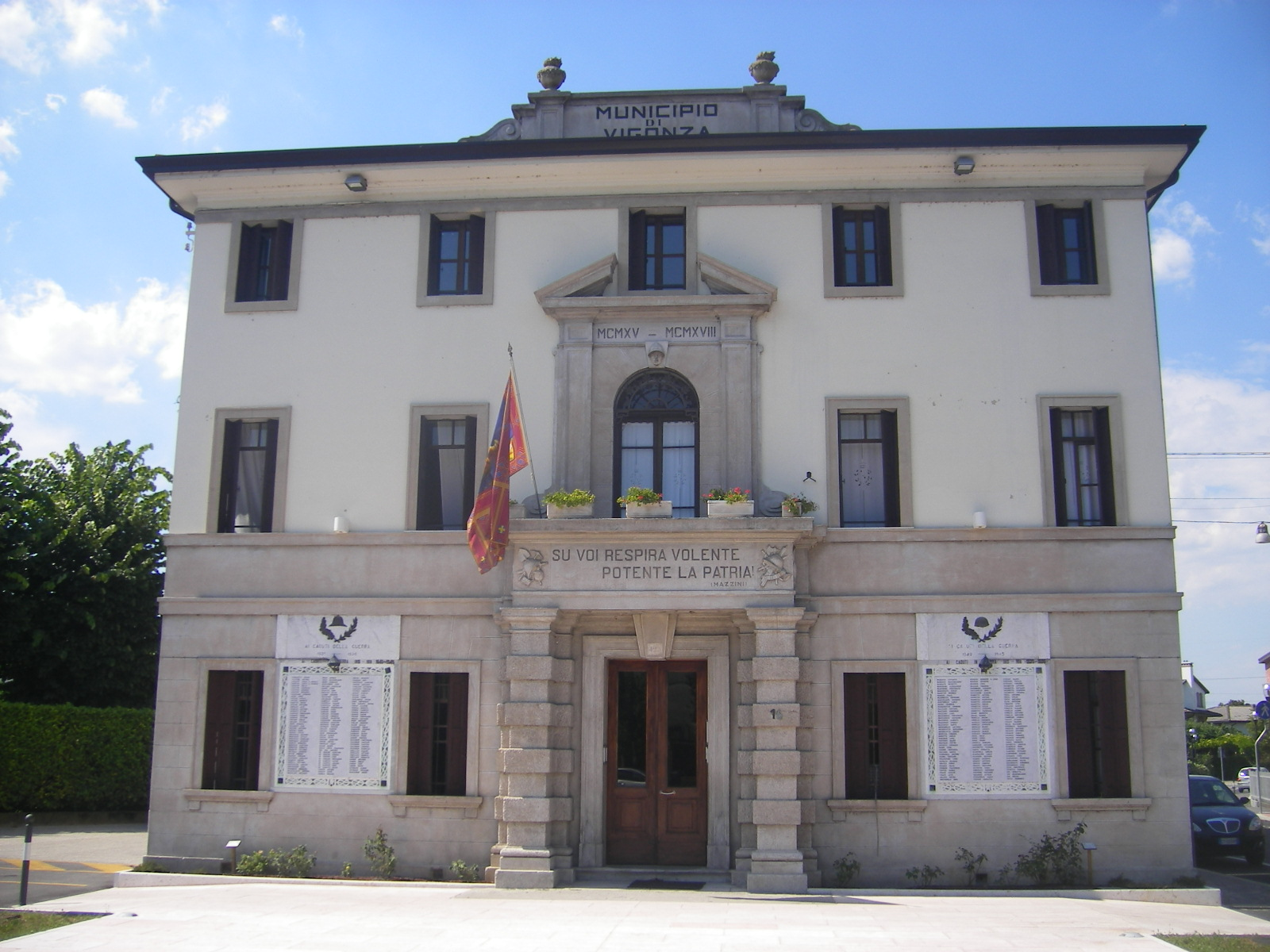
Vigonza

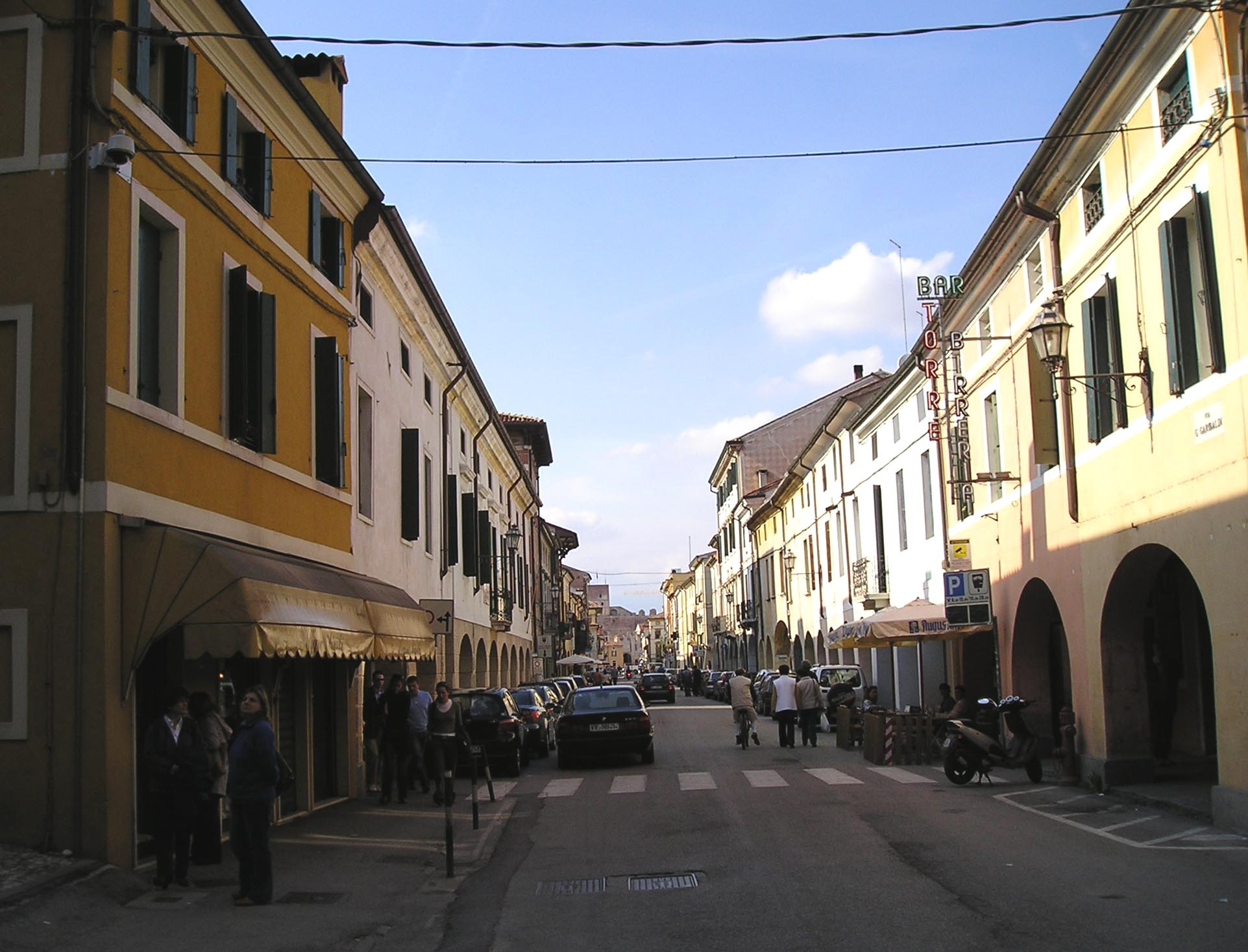
Cittadella

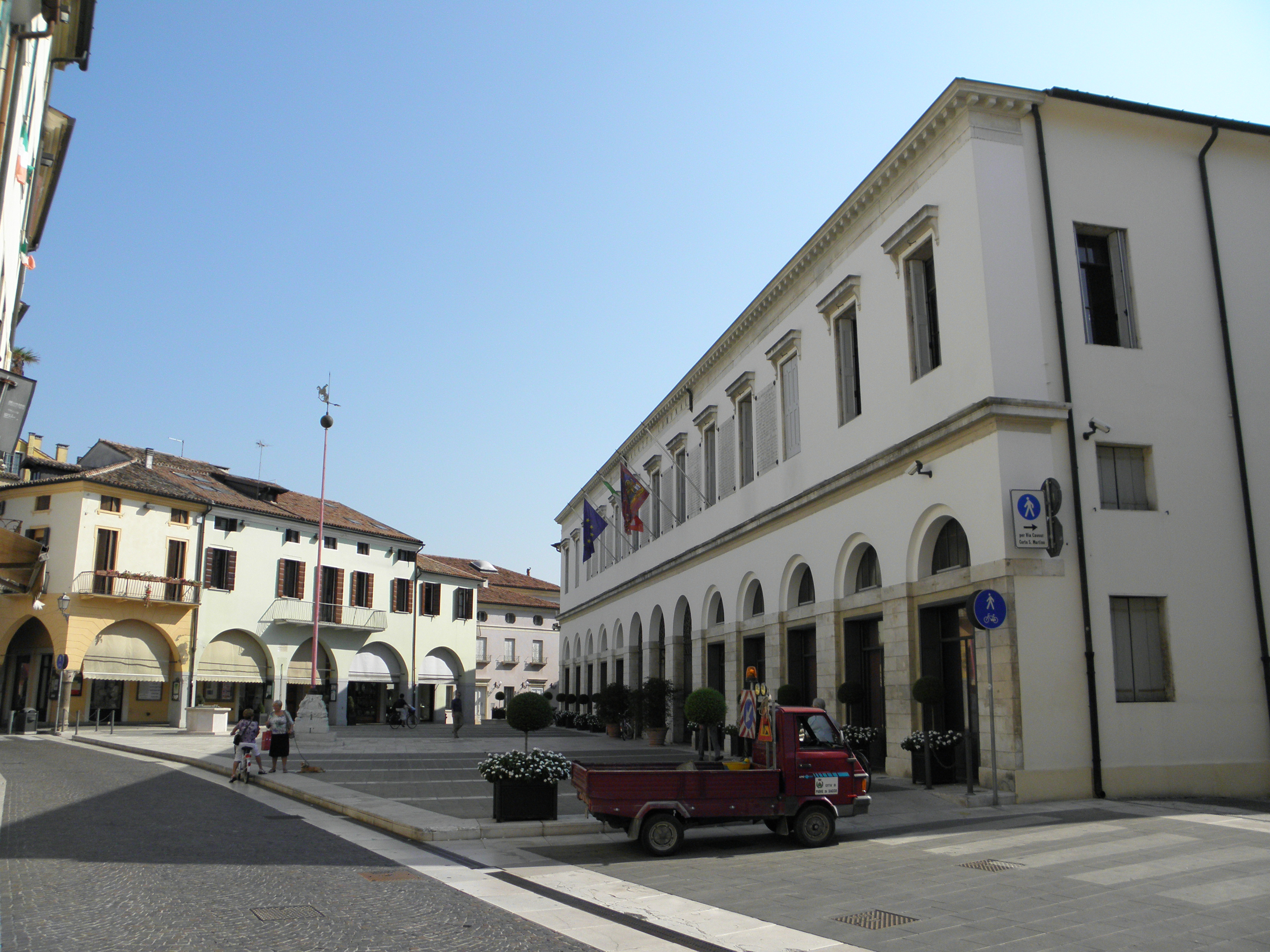
Piove di Sacco

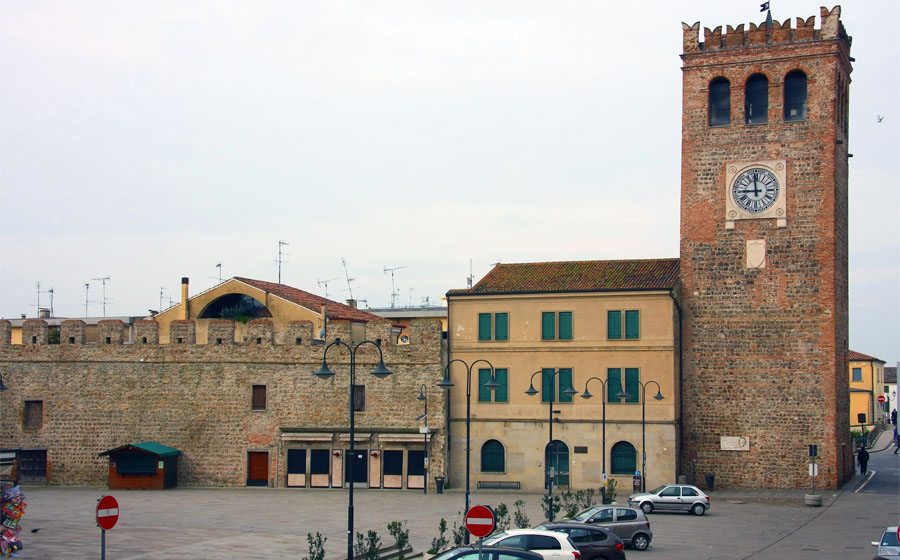
Monselice

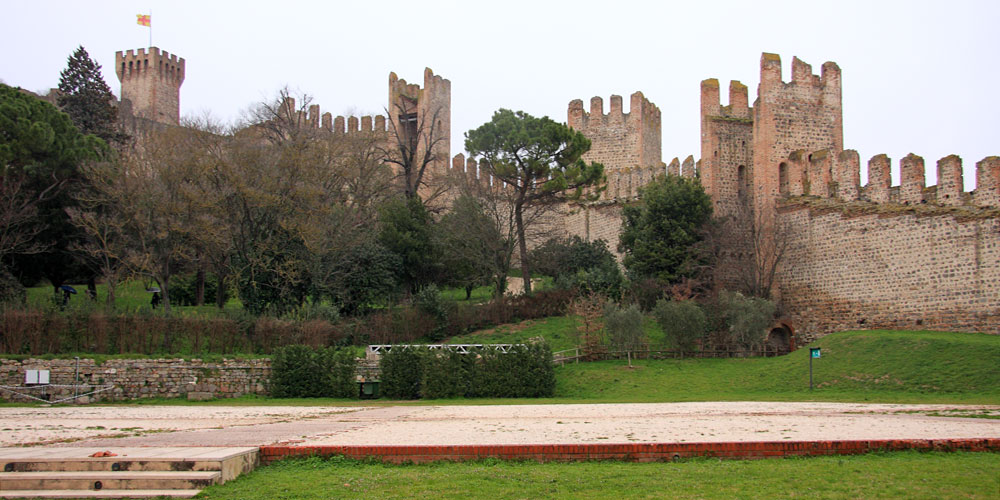
Este

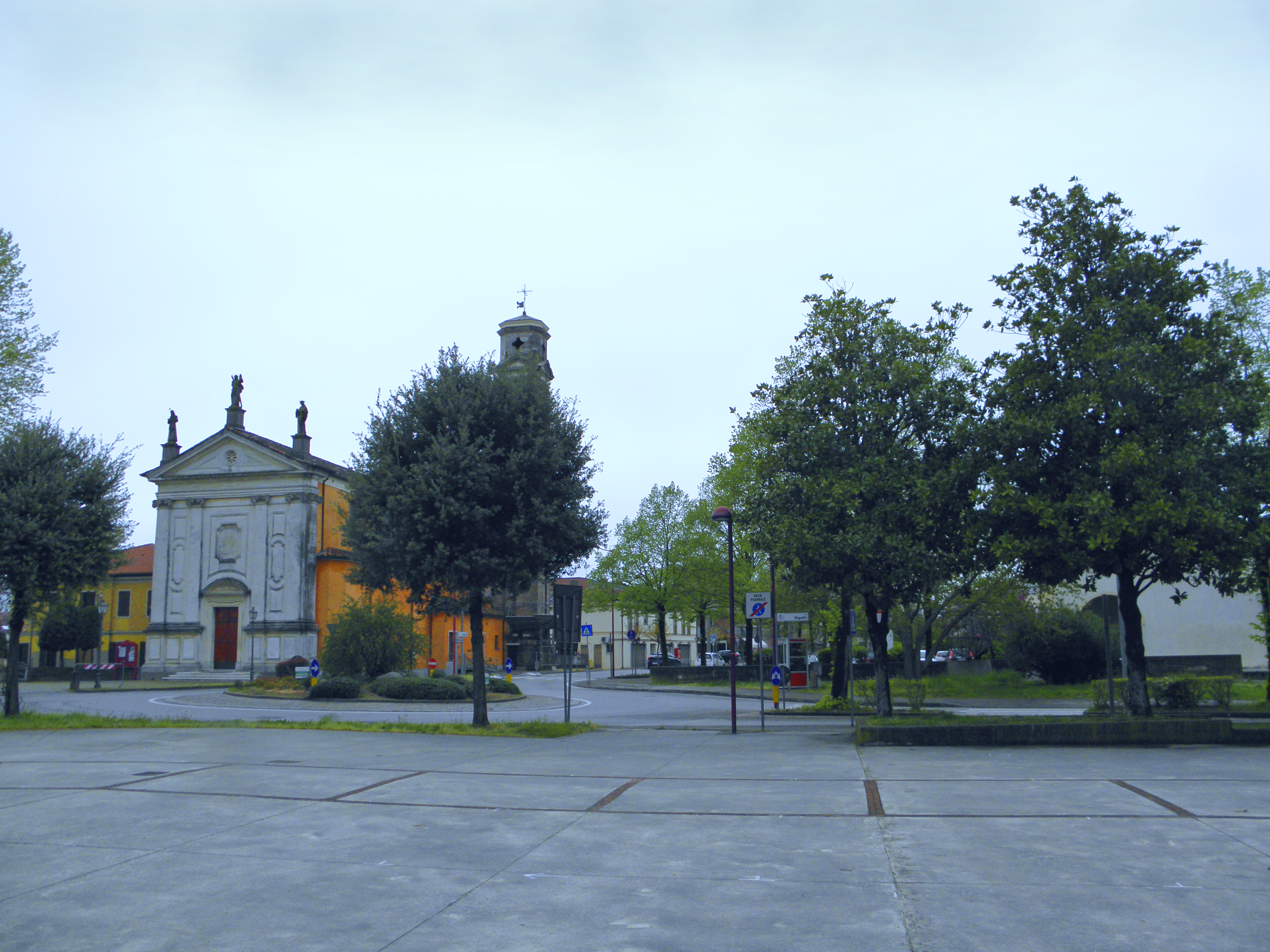
Cadoneghe

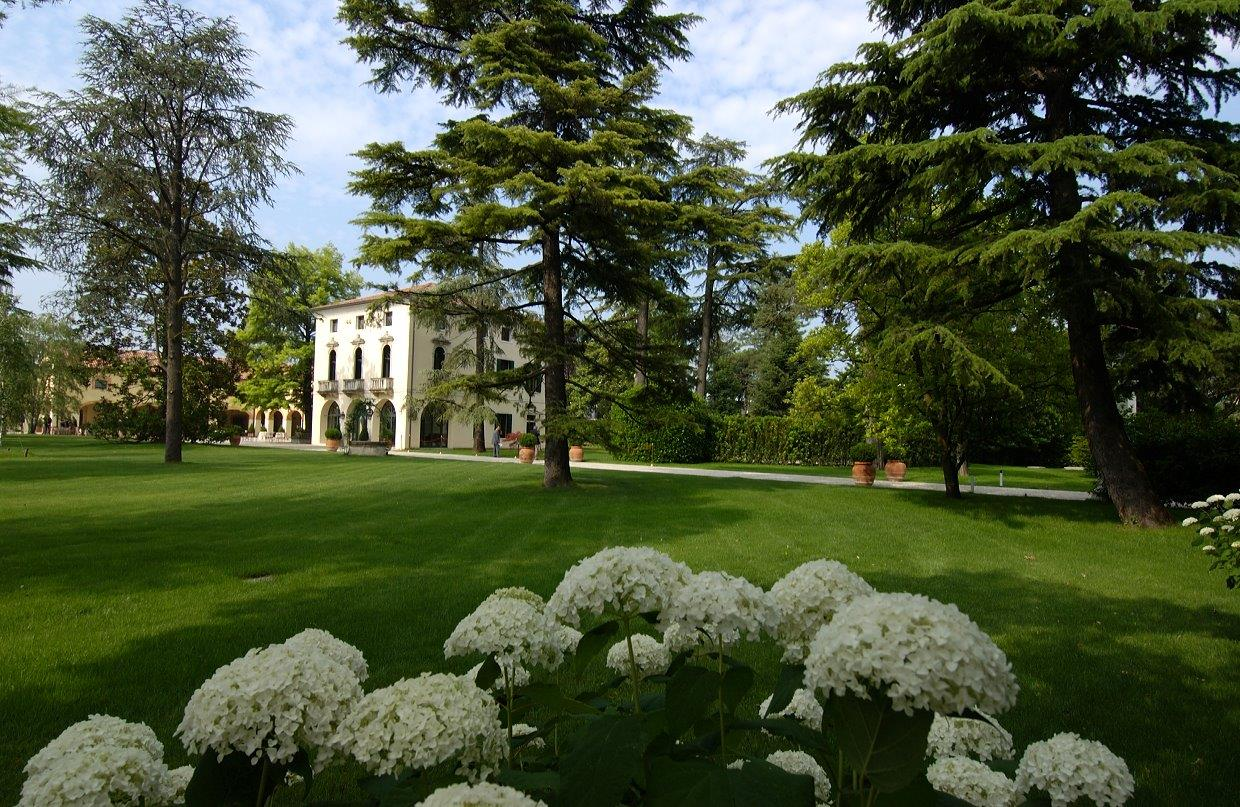
Rubano

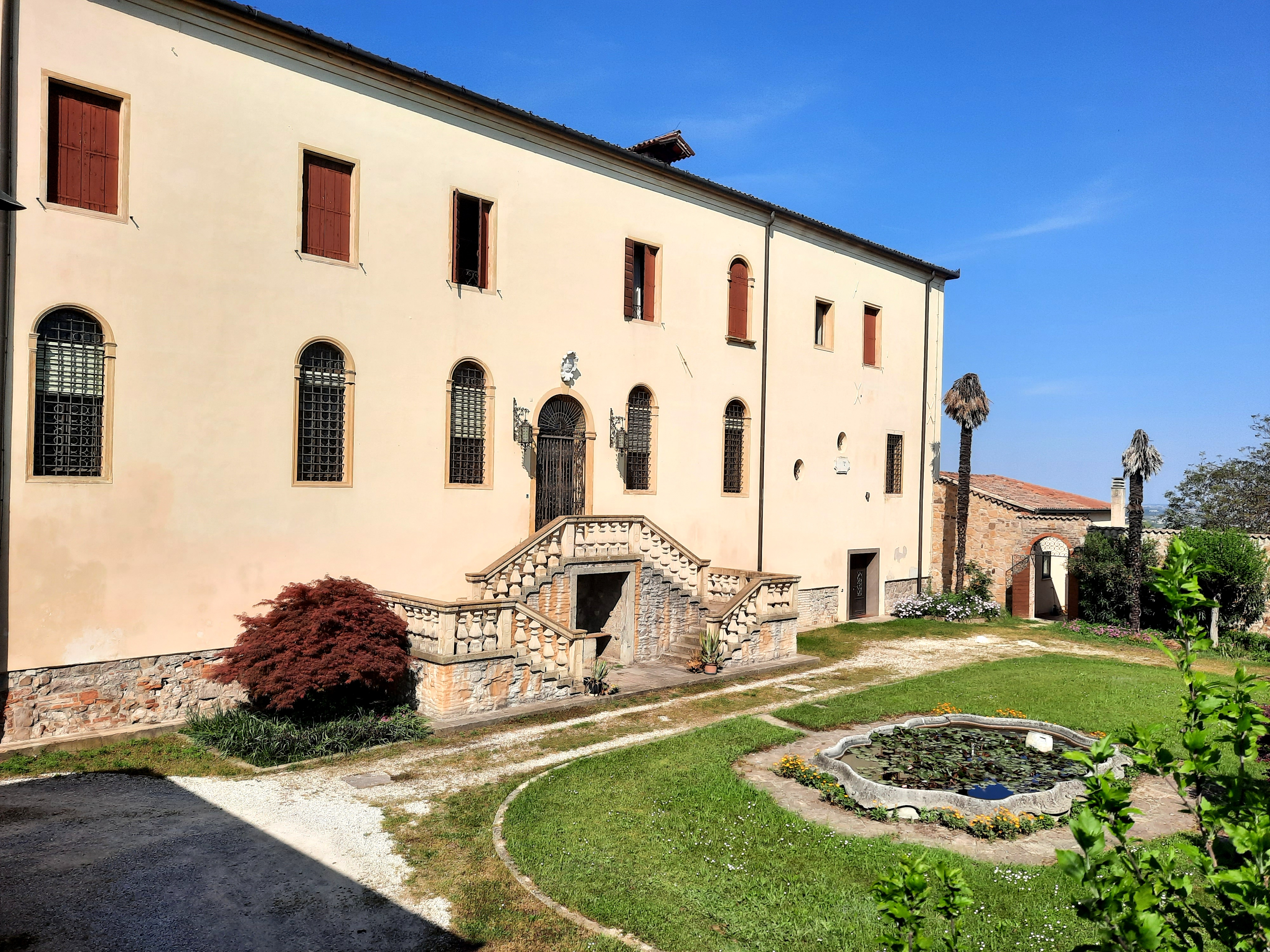
Abano Terme

The province has 101 municipalities:

- Abano Terme
- Agna
- Albignasego
- Anguillara Veneta
- Arquà Petrarca
- Arre
- Arzergrande
- Bagnoli di Sopra
- Baone
- Barbona
- Battaglia Terme
- Boara Pisani
- Borgo Veneto
- Borgoricco
- Bovolenta
- Brugine
- Cadoneghe
- Campo San Martino
- Campodarsego
- Campodoro
- Camposampiero
- Candiana
- Carmignano di Brenta
- Cartura
- Casale di Scodosia
- Casalserugo
- Castelbaldo
- Cervarese Santa Croce
- Cinto Euganeo
- Cittadella
- Codevigo
- Conselve
- Correzzola
- Curtarolo
- Due Carrare
- Este
- Fontaniva
- Galliera Veneta
- Galzignano Terme
- Gazzo
- Grantorto
- Granze
- Legnaro
- Limena
- Loreggia
- Lozzo Atestino
- Maserà di Padova
- Masi
- Massanzago
- Megliadino San Vitale
- Merlara
- Mestrino
- Monselice
- Montagnana
- Montegrotto Terme
- Noventa Padovana
- Ospedaletto Euganeo
- Padua
- Pernumia
- Piacenza d'Adige
- Piazzola sul Brenta
- Piombino Dese
- Piove di Sacco
- Polverara
- Ponso
- Ponte San Nicolò
- Pontelongo
- Pozzonovo
- Rovolon
- Rubano
- Saccolongo
- San Giorgio delle Pertiche
- San Giorgio in Bosco
- San Martino di Lupari
- San Pietro in Gu
- San Pietro Viminario
- Sant'Angelo di Piove di Sacco
- Sant'Elena
- Sant'Urbano
- Santa Caterina d'Este
- Santa Giustina in Colle
- Saonara
- Selvazzano Dentro
- Solesino
- Stanghella
- Teolo
- Terrassa Padovana
- Tombolo
- Torreglia
- Trebaseleghe
- Tribano
- Urbana
- Veggiano
- Vescovana
- Vigodarzere
- Vigonza
- Villa del Conte
- Villa Estense
- Villafranca Padovana
- Villanova di Camposampiero
- Vo'

== Demographics ==
As of 2026, the population is 934,540, of which 49.3% are male, and 50.7% are female. Minors make up 14.2% of the population, and seniors make up 25.1%.

Historical population

Year	Pop.	±%
1861	-	—
1871	364,856	—
1881	397,421	+8.9%
1901	444,360	+11.8%
1911	528,970	+19.0%
1921	592,611	+12.0%
1931	639,469	+7.9%
1936	668,025	+4.5%

Year	Pop.	±%
1951	715,039	+7.0%
1961	694,017	−2.9%
1971	762,998	+9.9%
1981	809,667	+6.1%
1991	820,318	+1.3%
2001	849,857	+3.6%
2011	921,361	+8.4%
2021	929,198	+0.9%

Source: ISTAT

=== Immigration ===
As of 2025, immigrants make up 13.1% of the population. The 5 largest foreign countries of birth are Romania, Moldova, Morocco, Albania, and China.

=== Quality of life ===
According to the European Environment Agency, in 2023 it was the 367th most polluted city in Europe (out of a sample of 375 cities) and the second in Italy, after the province of Cremona.

== Main sights ==
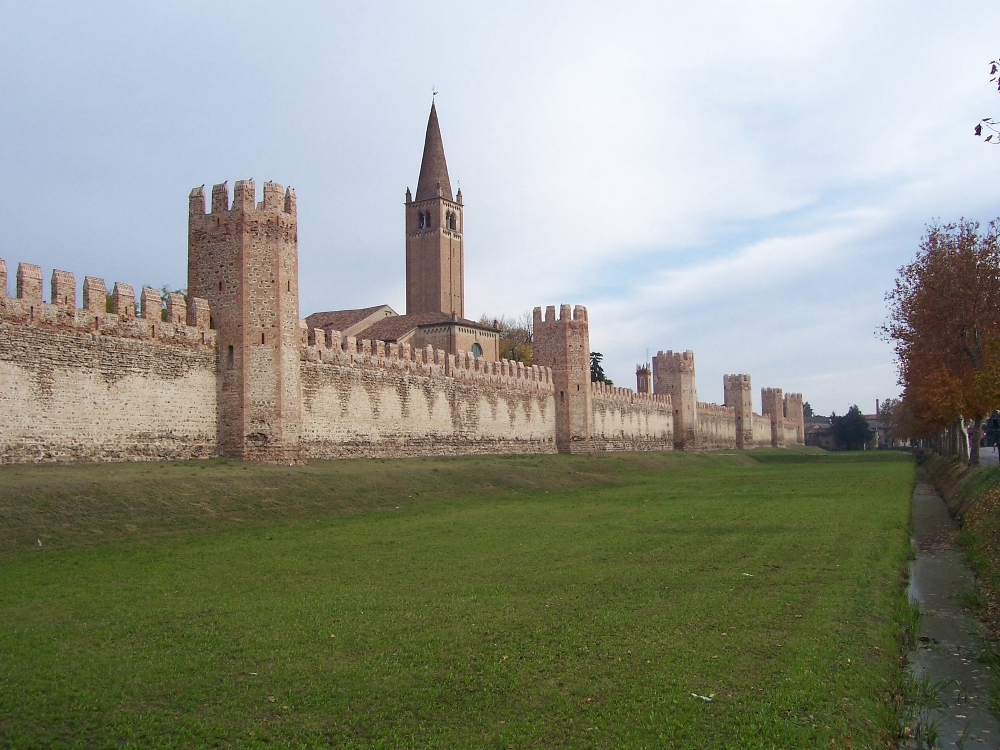
The city walls of Montagnana

Padua is home to some masterpieces from Medieval and Renaissance art and architecture, while the towns of Cittadella and Montagnana are known for the well preserved Medieval city walls. There are numerous villas in the countryside, a few of them from Palladio, the main ones being Villa Contarini (in Piazzola sul Brenta) and Villa Barbarigo (in Valsanzibio). The Euganei hills offer a relaxing naturalistic site, often covered in woods, while at their eastern slopes there are many ancient spa sites: the Terme Euganee, as Abano Terme, Montegrotto Terme, Galzignano Terme, Battaglia Terme. There is a small part of the Venetian Lagoon lying inside the province, the Valle Millecampi ("one-thousand-fields valley"); and also the river landscapes of the countryside include naturalistic routes, even for cycling or horse-riding. Travelling by boat is possible as well.

== Economy ==
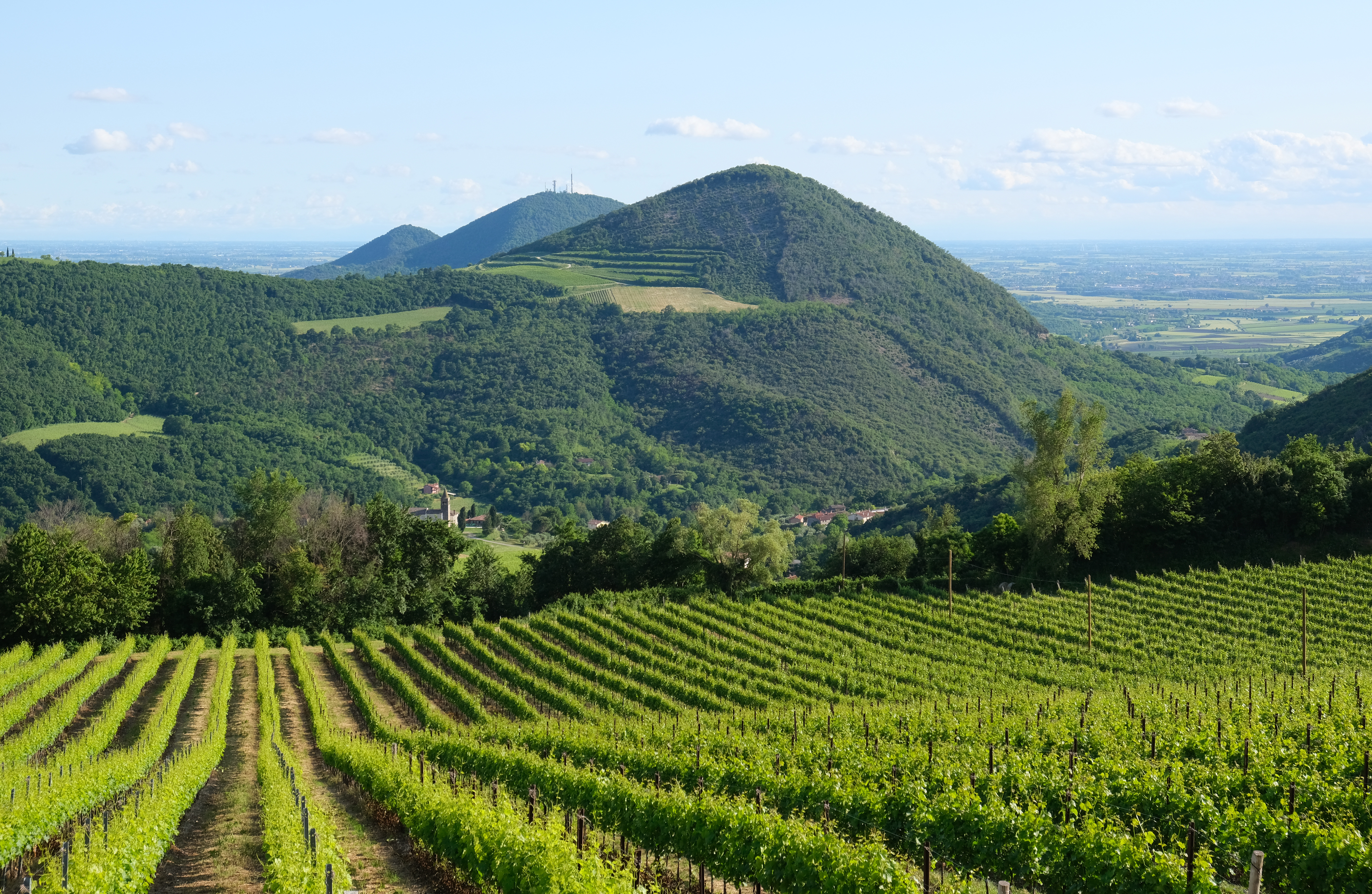
Vineyards near the Colli Euganei

The province has a thriving economy, in the metropolitan area and the alta pianura, due to the presence of numerous enterprises of every kind, mainly industrial ones, but also from tertiary and primary economical sectors; these areas are also densely populated. The bassa pianura is instead a mainly rural area, thus being poorer and less populated. Tourism is developed above all in the spa towns, while both in Padua and in the other parts of the province it may be considered under-developed, aside from the arrival of large numbers of pilgrims in Padua.

== Education ==
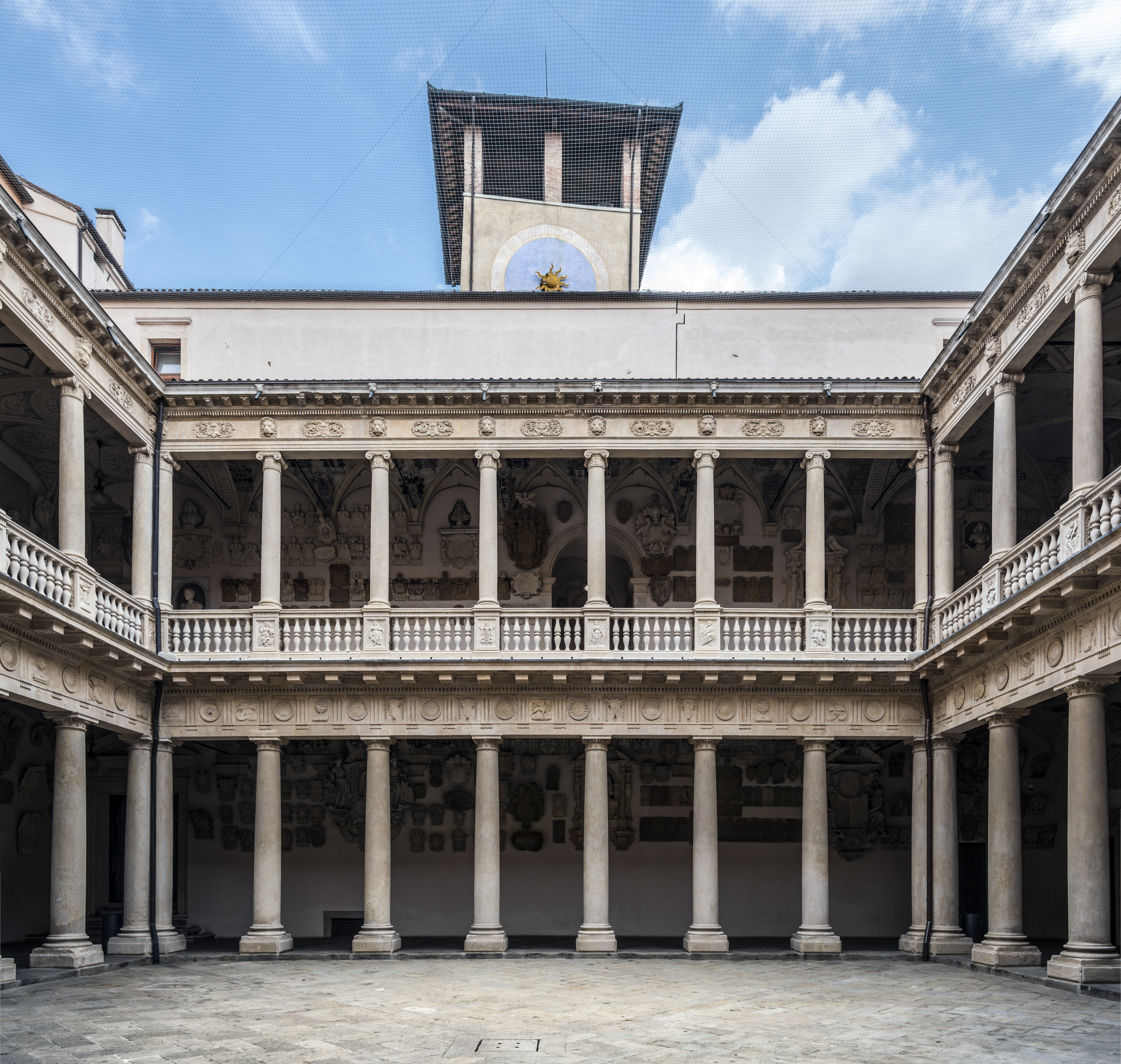
Palazzo Bo is the historical seat of University of Padua since 1493

The University of Padua (Italian: Università degli Studi di Padova, UNIPD) is an Italian public research university in Padua, Italy. It was founded in 1222 by a group of students and teachers from the University of Bologna, who previously settled in Vicenza; thus, it is the second-oldest university in Italy, as well as the world's fifth-oldest surviving university.

The University of Padua was one of the most prominent universities in early modern Europe, known particularly for the rigor of its Aristotelian logic and science. Together with the University of Bologna, Padua had a central role in the Italian Renaissance, housing and educating a number of Italian Renaissance mathematicians, amongst them Nicolaus Copernicus.

As of 2021, it is made up of 32 departments and eight schools. Padua is part a network of historical research universities known as the Coimbra Group. In 2021, the university had approximately 72,000 students including undergraduates, postgraduates, and doctoral students.

The university is conventionally said to have been founded in 1222 when a large group of students and professors left the University of Bologna in search of more academic freedom ('Libertas scholastica'). Although it is certain that schools of law and medicine with students from various nations existed near Padua for a few years before 1222, more precisely in Vicenza. In reality, the first place where this group of students and professors from Bologna settled was at the University of Vicenza, where they were welcomed. Due to various vicissitudes the headquarters was permanently moved to Padua for various reasons. The first subjects to be taught were law and theology. The curriculum expanded rapidly, and by 1399 the institution had divided in two: a Universitas Iuristarum for civil law and Canon law, and a Universitas Artistarum which taught astronomy, dialectic, philosophy, grammar, medicine, and rhetoric. There was also a Universitas Theologorum, established in 1373 by Urban V.

== Sport ==
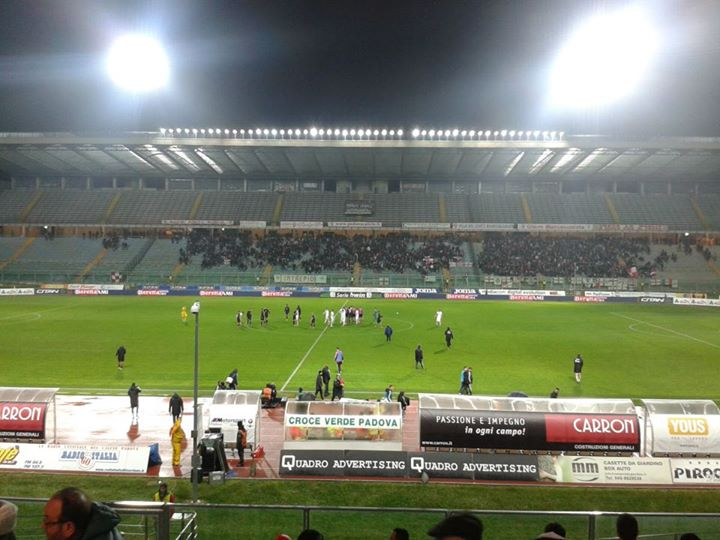
Stadio Euganeo

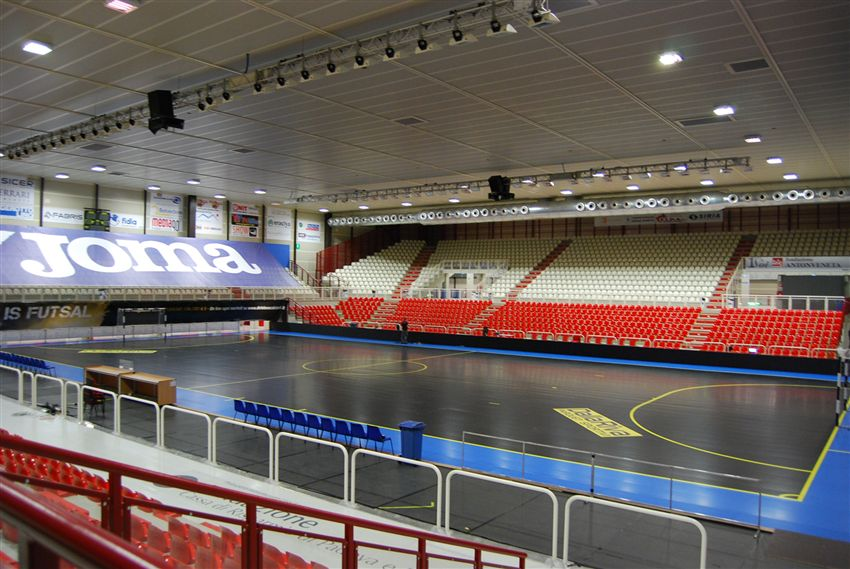
Palasport San Lazzaro

Several sports are practiced in the province of Padua. The most popular is football: every village as well as every city parish has its own little team, out of the most important ones playing in the Italian professional or amateur championships; and futsal is widespread too. Rugby union and volleyball are popular sports too; there are several teams also for basketball and field hockey; water polo, American football and baseball are played too. Among individual sports, cycling, athletics, swimming, rowing, tennis, fencing, golf, and horseback riding are often practiced, as well as martial arts.

Major club teams of the province include:

- Football:

- Calcio Padova, now playing lega Pro, won 1 Coppa Italia Serie C;
- A.S. Cittadella, Serie B;
- A.C. Este, Serie D;
- Luparense San Paolo F.C., Serie D;
- Monselice Calcio 1926, Eccellenza Veneto, played up to Serie C;
- Unione Sportiva Luparense, Promozione, played up to Serie C;
- A.S. Petrarca Calcio, Seconda Categoria, played up to Prima Divisione;
- Ženský Padova, Serie B, women's football;
- no more existing: Gamma 3 Padova won 2 times the championship and 1 the Coppa Italia.

- Futsal:

- Luparense Calcio a 5, Serie A1, won 3 times the championship, 2 the Coppa Italia and 3 Supercoppa;
- Petrarca Calcio a 5, Serie B.

- Rugby union:

- Petrarca Rugby, Top12, won 12 times the championship (last time 2011) and 2 times the Coppa Italia;
- Roccia Rugby, Serie A;
- CUS Padova Rugby, Serie B;
- Valsugana Rugby, men's rugby Serie A, women's rugby Serie A Elite;
- Ercole Monselice, Serie C;
- no more existing: Fiamme Oro Padova, won 5 times the championship and 4 times the Coppa Italia.

- Volleyball:

- Pallavolo Padova, Serie A1, won 1 CEV Cup;
- Silvolley Trebaseleghe, Serie B1;
- Megius Volley Club Padova, women's volleyball Serie C.

- Water Polo:

- Plebiscito Padova, men's Serie A2, women's Serie A1.

- Field Hockey:

- CUS Padova Hockey, men's Serie A1, women's Serie A2.

- Basketball:

- Gattamelata Albignasego, Serie B Dilettanti.

- American Football:

- Saints Padova, Campionato A2 LENAF.

- Baseball:

- Padova Baseball, Serie A federale. (www.padovabaseball.com )

== Transport ==
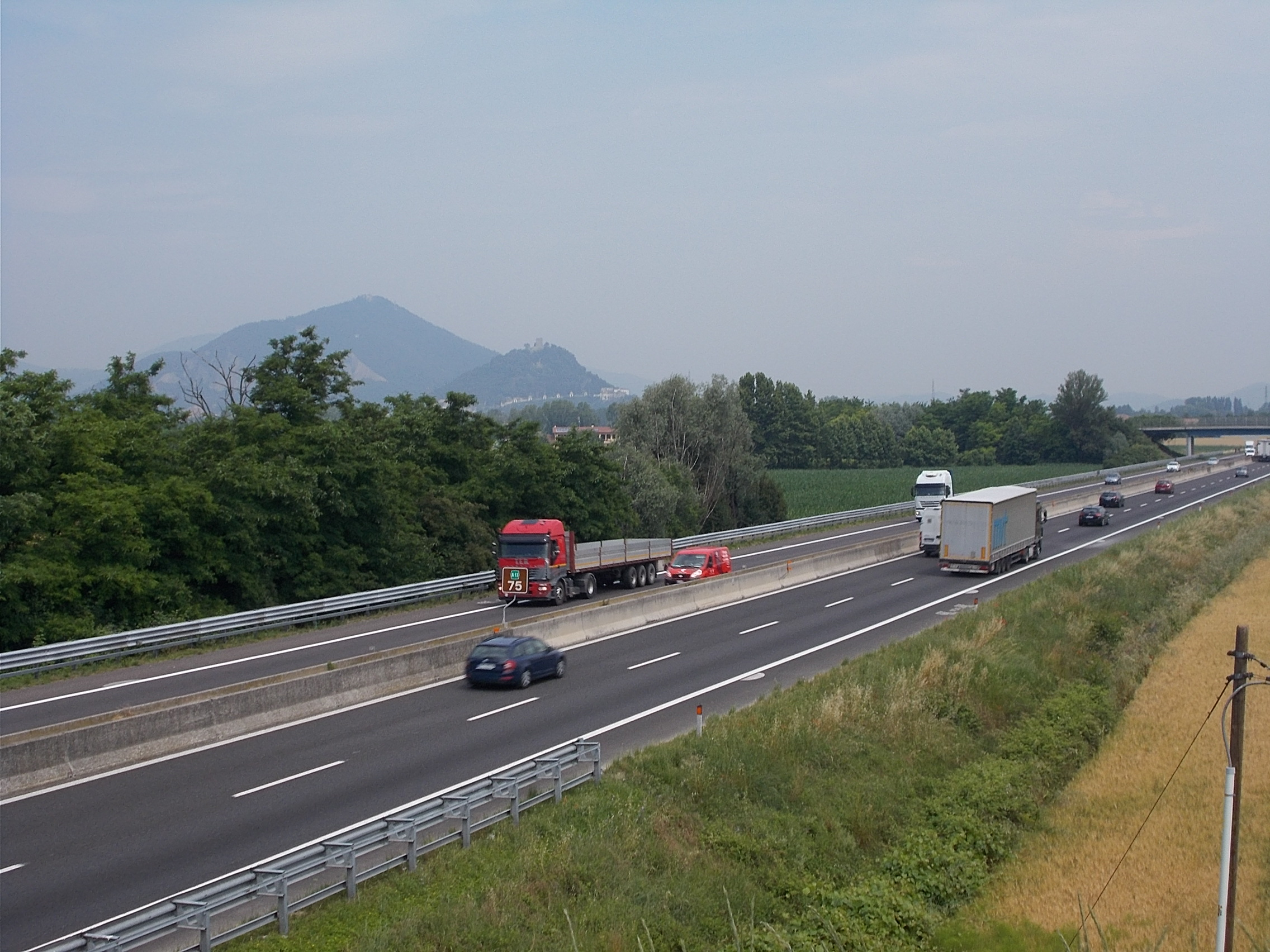
Autostrada A13 near Monselice

=== Motorways ===
- Autostrada A4: Turin-Trieste
- Autostrada A13: Bologna-Padua
- Autostrada A31: Piovene Rocchette-Rovigo

=== Railway lines ===
- Milan–Venice railway
- Padua–Bologna railway
- Calalzo–Padua railway
- Mantua–Monselice railway

=== Airports ===
- Padua Airport

== See also ==
- Colli Euganei
- Padua
- Padua metropolitan area
- Roman Catholic Diocese of Padua
- Tangenziale di Padova
