= San Giorgio delle Pertiche =

- Comune
- Comune di San Giorgio delle Pertiche
- Location within Italy Location within Veneto
- Coordinates: 45°32′N 11°55′E
- Country: Italy
- Region: Veneto
- Province: Province of Padua (PD)
- Frazioni: Arsego, Cavino

Government
  - Mayor: Daniele Canella (Lega)

Area
  - Total: 18.8 km^{2} (7.3 sq mi)

Population (Dec. 2004)
  - Total: 8,617
  - Density: 458/km^{2} (1,190/sq mi)
- Time zone: UTC+1 (CET)
  - Summer (DST): UTC+2 (CEST)
- Postal code: 35010
- Dialing code: 049
- Website: https://www.comune.sangiorgiodellepertiche.pd.it/

San Giorgio delle Pertiche is a comune (municipality) in the Province of Padua in the Italian region Veneto, located about 35 kilometres (22 mi) northwest of Venice and about 14 kilometres (9 mi) northeast of Padua. As of 31 December 2004, it had a population of 8,617 and an area of 18.8 square kilometres (7.3 mi^{2}).

The municipality of San Giorgio delle Pertiche contains the frazioni (subdivisions, mainly villages and hamlets) Arsego and Cavino.

San Giorgio delle Pertiche borders the following municipalities: Borgoricco, Campo San Martino, Campodarsego, Camposampiero, Curtarolo, Santa Giustina in Colle, Vigodarzere.

== Demographic evolution ==
Historical population

Year	Pop.	±%
1861	?	—
1871	3,026	—
1881	3,485	+15.2%
1901	4,159	+19.3%
1911	5,252	+26.3%

Year	Pop.	±%
1921	6,003	+14.3%
1931	5,564	−7.3%
1936	5,595	+0.6%
1951	5,864	+4.8%
1961	5,643	−3.8%

Year	Pop.	±%
1971	6,608	+17.1%
1981	6,880	+4.1%
1991	7,115	+3.4%
2001	7,846	+10.3%

Source: Data from ISTAT
