= Villanova di Camposampiero =

- Comune
- Comune di Villanova di Camposampiero
- Location within Italy Location within Veneto
- Coordinates: 45°29′N 11°58′E
- Country: Italy
- Region: Veneto
- Province: Province of Padua (PD)

Area
  - Total: 12.2 km^{2} (4.7 sq mi)

Population (Dec. 2004)
  - Total: 5,127
  - Density: 420/km^{2} (1,090/sq mi)
- Time zone: UTC+1 (CET)
  - Summer (DST): UTC+2 (CEST)
- Postal code: 35010
- Dialing code: 049

Villanova di Camposampiero is a comune (municipality) in the Province of Padua in the Italian region Veneto, located about 30 kilometres (19 mi) west of Venice and about 11 kilometres (7 mi) northeast of Padua. As of 31 December 2004, it had a population of 5,127 and an area of 12.2 square kilometres (4.7 mi^{2}).

Villanova di Camposampiero borders the following municipalities: Borgoricco, Campodarsego, Pianiga, Santa Maria di Sala, Vigonza.

== Demographic evolution ==
Historical population

Year	Pop.	±%
1861	?	—
1871	1,773	—
1881	2,035	+14.8%
1901	2,578	+26.7%
1911	3,267	+26.7%

Year	Pop.	±%
1921	3,780	+15.7%
1931	3,829	+1.3%
1936	4,042	+5.6%
1951	4,072	+0.7%
1961	3,865	−5.1%

Year	Pop.	±%
1971	4,078	+5.5%
1981	4,375	+7.3%
1991	4,514	+3.2%
2001	4,849	+7.4%

Source: Data from ISTAT
