= San Giorgio in Bosco =

- Comune
- Comune di San Giorgio in Bosco
- Location within Italy Location within Veneto
- Coordinates: 45°35′N 11°48′E
- Country: Italy
- Region: Veneto
- Province: Padua (PD)
- Frazioni: Paviola, Lobia, Sant'Anna Morosina

Government
  - Mayor: Renato Roberto Miatello

Area
  - Total: 28.1 km^{2} (10.8 sq mi)
- Elevation: 29 m (95 ft)

Population (31 December 2015)
  - Total: 6,263
  - Density: 223/km^{2} (577/sq mi)
- Demonym: Sangiorgensi
- Time zone: UTC+1 (CET)
  - Summer (DST): UTC+2 (CEST)
- Postal code: 35010
- Dialing code: 049

San Giorgio in Bosco is a comune (municipality) in the Province of Padua in the Italian region Veneto, located about 45 kilometres (28 mi) northwest of Venice and about 20 kilometres (12 mi) northwest of Padua.

San Giorgio in Bosco borders the following municipalities: Campo San Martino, Cittadella, Fontaniva, Grantorto, Piazzola sul Brenta, Tombolo and Villa del Conte.
