= Curtarolo =

- Comune
- Comune di Curtarolo
- Location within Italy Location within Veneto
- Coordinates: 45°31′N 11°50′E
- Country: Italy
- Region: Veneto
- Province: Padua (PD)
- Frazioni: Santa Maria di Non, Pieve di Curtarolo

Government
  - Mayor: Martina Rocchio

Area
  - Total: 14.73 km^{2} (5.69 sq mi)
- Elevation: 20 m (66 ft)

Population (31 August 2021)
  - Total: 7,116
  - Density: 483.1/km^{2} (1,251/sq mi)
- Demonym: Curtarolesi
- Time zone: UTC+1 (CET)
  - Summer (DST): UTC+2 (CEST)
- Postal code: 35010
- Dialing code: 049
- Website: Official website

Curtarolo is a comune (municipality) in the Province of Padua in the Italian region Veneto, located about 40 kilometres (25 mi) west of Venice and about 11 kilometres (7 mi) north of Padua. As of 31 December 2004, it had a population of 6,775 and an area of 14.9 square kilometres (5.8 mi^{2}).

Curtarolo borders the following municipalities: Campo San Martino, Limena, Piazzola sul Brenta, San Giorgio delle Pertiche, Vigodarzere.
