= Fabrizio De Poli =

Italian footballer (born 1958)

Personal information
- Date of birth: 10 January 1958 (age 68)
- Place of birth: Tombolo, Veneto, Italy
- Height: 1.76 m (5 ft 9 in)
- Position: Midfielder

Youth career
- Cittadella

Senior career*
Years	Team	Apps	(Gls)
1978–1979	Treviso	28	(1)
1979–1980	S.P.A.L.	9	(1)
1980–1983	Padova	51	(5)
1983–1985	Livorno	59	(7)
1985–1986	Lucchese	30	(2)
1986–1989	Montevarchi	88	(2)
1989–1992	Arezzo	63	(1)
Total		328	(19)
- * Club domestic league appearances and goals

Fabrizio De Poli (born 10 January 1958) is an Italian football administrator and former player.

== Playing career ==
De Poli played in Serie B with S.P.A.L. in the 1979–80 season.

== Administrator career ==
De Poli worked as administrator for the Cittadella, Genoa, Lucchese and Vicenza. From 2014 to 2016, he worked for Padova. From 12 November 2016 to 1 June 2017 he worked as general manager for Taranto.
