= Luparense F.C. =

Luparense F.C. may refer to:

- Luparense F.C. (futsal), in San Martino di Lupari, Italy
- Luparense F.C. (football), an Italian association football and futsal club in San Martino di Lupari
- Luparense San Paolo F.C.
