= Tangenziale di Padova =

The GRAP (Grande Raccordo Anulare di Padova) is the orbital motorway surrounding Padua, northern Italy. It is also called Tangenziale di Padova.

Usually, it consists of 2 lanes and 1 emergency lane for a dual carriageways. The only exception is the Padova Est (East Padua) bridge, which has 3 lanes and 1 emergency lane.

On almost all the beltway, the speed limit is 90 km/h and filling stations are present. A regular service of gritters is active during winter, including snowploughs when needed.

The actual GRAP was built between 1963 and 2005, the south and west parts being the oldest ones, and the north and Limena parts the most recent ones. A new path is planned, building new west and north highways to bypass the entire Paduan metropolitan area.

The GRAP consists of the following freeways.

== Tangenziale Nord ==
The North Beltway runs parallel to the A4 motorway, connecting the areas of Padova Ovest (West Padua) and Padova Est (East Padua), where it connects to the A4. It is the only part of GRAP to have 110 km/h speed limit and not to have any filling station.

TANGENZIALE NORD DI PADOVA
Exit	Number
Tangenziale Est di Padova
Strada Regionale 308 del Santo per Castelfranco V.to
Padova Statale Noalese	
Padova Via Pontevigodarzere - Q.ri Pontevigodarzere/Arcella; Stadio del Plebiscito; P+Bus; P+TRAM under construction	
Padova Casello Padova Ovest	
Tangenziale Ovest di Padova

== Tangenziale Est ==
The East Beltway connects the areas of Padova Sud (South Padua, where it connects to A13 motorway) and Padova Est (A4). It runs through the residential and the main industrial areas of the city of Padua (the Padua Industrial Zone, or ZIP). The northern part, called Corso Argentina and Corso Kennedy, was built between 1963 and 1970 as the main north–south axis for commercial traffic of the Padua Industrial Zone, together with the construction of this large industrial area; while the southern part was built more recently, between the late 1990s and early 2000s (decade).

TANGENZIALE EST DI PADOVA
Exit	Number
Autostrada A13|Barriera di Padova Sud Autostrada A13
Tangenziale Sud di Padova
Padova Via Guizza - Q.re Guizza - Albignasego P+TRAM	
Padova Via Bembo - Q.re Salboro	
Padova Via Piovese - Q.re Voltabarozzo - P+Bus; Ospedale Sant'Antonio e Ospedale Centrale - Zona Ospedali	
Padova Corso Stati Uniti - Padova Zona Industriale - Interporto; Casello di Padova Zona Industriale; Raccordo Autostradale A4 - A13	
Padova Via Vigonovese	
Padova Viale della Navigazione Interna	
Padova Viale dell'Industria	
Padova Casello Padova Est; Sheraton Padova Hotel - Ikea	
Padova San Lazzaro - Quadrante Est; Centro città - Padova San Lazzaro railway station (under construction); Ponte di Brenta railway station	
Tangenziale Nord di Padova
SR 308 Del Santo

== Tangenziale Ovest ==
The West Beltway covers the western part of the city and runs inside it. It is also referred to as the Corso Australia (Australia Boulevard) from the city name of its main part. It is the second oldest beltway of the city, initially intended just as a junction between Padova Sud and Padova Ovest motorway tolls, and this is the reason why the carriages are so narrow and it passes through the west part of the city and not out of it.

TANGENZIALE OVEST DI PADOVA
Exit	Number
Autostrada A4|Barriera di Padova Ovest Autostrada A4
Tangenziale Nord di Padova SS 47
Padova Via Po - Q.re San Bellino	
Padova Via Rocco - Stadio Euganeo	
Padova Via Montà - Q.re Montà - P+Bus	
Padova Via Chiesanuova - Rubano-Sarmeola; Padova Campo Marte railway station	
Padova Via dei Colli - Via Sorio - Q.re Brusegana; Padova Airport	
Bretelle in direzione di Abano Terme e Selvazzano Dentro	
Tangenziale Sud di Padova

== Tangenziale Sud ==
The South Beltway is the shortest one, connecting Tangenziale Ovest to A13 motorway and Tangenziale Est; a short part, immediately coming from A13 (Padova Sud), has a 130 km/h speed limit, as most Italian motorways.

TANGENZIALE SUD DI PADOVA
Exit	Number
Tangenziale Ovest di Padova
Padova Via Armistizio	
Padova Via Adriatica; Strada Statale Padova Lecce	
Padova bretella ingresso autostrada A13 barriera di Padova Sud	
Tangenziale Est di Padova

== Tangenziale di Limena ==
It is the continuation of Tangenziale Ovest toward north-west. It does not run in the city area but immediately outwards, bypassing the town of Limena.

== SR308 Nuova Strada del Santo ==
The Strada Regionale (Regional Road) 308, also called Nuova Strada del Santo (New Saint Road, where the Saint stands for Saint Anthony of Padua) is not usually included in the GRAP, but it is still connected to it. It runs in the north-east, being the straight continuation northward of Tangenziale Est, for several kilometers in the Paduan countryside, to the town of Castelfranco Veneto (in the Treviso countryside), a path fully completed in early 2011. It is a single carriageway and the speed limit is between 70 km/h and 90 km/h.

== Future Projects ==
The GRAP will be expanded, in order to bypass north and west parts of the city, so having a better connection to hinterland towns, de facto doubling the orbital motorway to the west and to the north. Works should begin before the end of 2011: but, in fact, they are already under way with the construction of the bretella for Selvazzano Dentro.

The junction roads (bretelle) for Abano Terme and Selvazzano Dentro from Tangenziale Ovest are currently under construction: their end date has moved on, due to some trouble of the contractor enterprise, and they should be completed between October 2011 (Selvazzano) and spring 2012 (Abano).

== See also ==
- Grande Raccordo Anulare: A ring road around Rome.
- Padua metropolitan area
