= Campo San Martino =

- Comune
- Comune di Campo San Martino
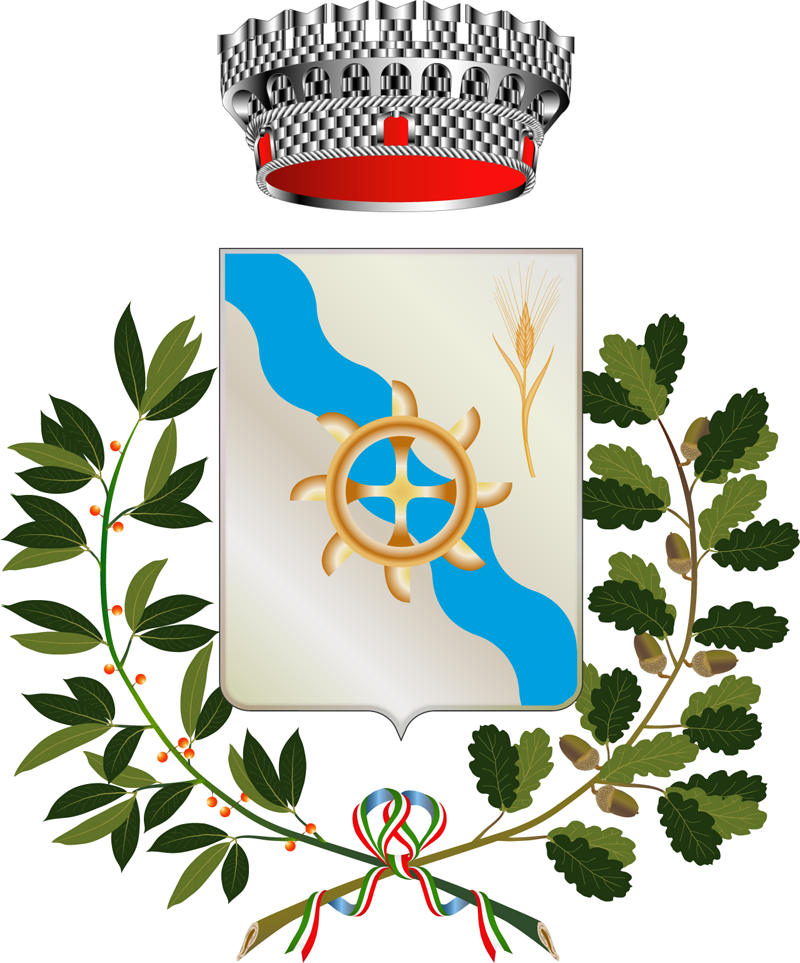
- Coat of arms

- Location within Italy Location within Veneto
- Coordinates: 45°33′N 11°49′E
- Country: Italy
- Region: Veneto
- Province: Padua (PD)
- Frazioni: Marsango, Busiago

Government
  - Mayor: Dario Luigi Tardivo

Area
  - Total: 13.16 km^{2} (5.08 sq mi)
- Elevation: 13 m (43 ft)

Population (31 August 2021)
  - Total: 5,621
  - Density: 427.1/km^{2} (1,106/sq mi)
- Demonym: Camposammartinari or Camposammartinesi
- Time zone: UTC+1 (CET)
  - Summer (DST): UTC+2 (CEST)
- Postal code: 35010
- Dialing code: 049
- Website: Official website

Campo San Martino is a comune (municipality) in the Province of Padua in the Italian region Veneto, located about 40 kilometres (25 mi) northwest of Venice and about 15 kilometres (9 mi) north of Padua.

Campo San Martino borders the following municipalities: Curtarolo, Piazzola sul Brenta, San Giorgio delle Pertiche, San Giorgio in Bosco, Santa Giustina in Colle, Villa del Conte.
