= Loreggia =

- Comune
- Comune di Loreggia
- Location of Loreggia in Italy Loreggia (Veneto)
- Coordinates: 45°36′N 11°57′E
- Country: Italy
- Region: Veneto
- Province: Padua (PD)
- Frazioni: Loreggiola

Government
  - Mayor: Manuela Marangon

Area
  - Total: 19.12 km^{2} (7.38 sq mi)
- Elevation: 26 m (85 ft)

Population (31 August 2022)
  - Total: 7,596
  - Density: 397.3/km^{2} (1,029/sq mi)
- Demonym: Loreggiani
- Time zone: UTC+1 (CET)
  - Summer (DST): UTC+2 (CEST)
- Postal code: 35010
- Dialing code: 049
- Website: Official website

Loreggia is a comune (municipality) in the Province of Padua in the Italian region Veneto, located about 35 kilometres (22 mi) northwest of Venice and about 20 kilometres (12 mi) northeast of Padua.

Loreggia borders the following municipalities: Camposampiero, Castelfranco Veneto, Piombino Dese, Resana, San Martino di Lupari, Santa Giustina in Colle.

== Twin towns ==
Loreggia is twinned with:

- Borghetto di Borbera, Italy, since 2001
