= Vigontina San Paolo FC =

Italian football club

Vigontina San Paolo Football Club
- Full name: Vigontina San Paolo F.C.
- Founded: 1965; 2010 (refounded); 2014 (refounded)
- Ground: Stadio comunale, Vigonza, Veneto, Italy
- League: Prima Categoria
Home colours	Away colours

Vigontina San Paolo F.C. is an Italian association football team of the city of Vigonza and Padova, Veneto. It currently plays in Prima Categoria.

== History ==
=== San Paolo Padova ===
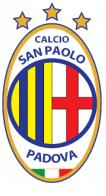
San Paolo Padova old logo.

The club was founded in 2010 after the merger with A.S. San Paolo (founded in 1965 and just relegated to Promozione at the end of the 2009-10 Eccellenza season) and the Serie D club of Albignasego Calcio, founded in 1959.

Its first official football match in Serie D was on 29 August 2010, against Treviso, for the Coppa Italia di Serie D: San Paolo Padova won the match by 2–0.

It was played on the neutral venue of Rovigo, since Stadio Plebiscito was still not available for football matches.

In the summer of 2014, the San Paolo Padova S.r.l. declares bankruptcy.

=== Atletico San Paolo Padova ===
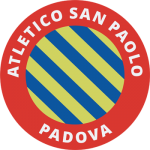
Atletico San Paolo Padova old logo (2014–2015).

On 11 July, the A.R.L. S.S.D. Atletico San Paolo Padova detects rights. At the end of the 2014–15 season in Serie D, relegated to Eccellenza.

=== Luparense San Paolo Football Club ===
June 22, 2015 Atletico San Paolo Padova changes its name in Luparense San Paolo Football Club moving in San Martino di Lupari, forming the main team of the city.

August 5 is admitted at 2015–16 Serie D.

=== Vigontina San Paolo Football Club ===
Tombolo Vigontina San Paolo F.C. Logo

June 17, 2016 Luparense San Paolo Football Club changes its name in Vigontina San Paolo Football Club moving in Vigonza, forming the main team of the city. At the end of the 2016–17 season in Serie D/C, they were relegated to Eccellenza.

=== Tombolo Vigontina San Paolo Football Club ===
June 9, 2018 Vigontina San Paolo Football Club changes its name in Tombolo Vigontina San Paolo Football Club moving te first team in Tombolo.

=== Vigontina San Paolo Football Club ===
In July, 2021 Tombolo Vigontina San Paolo Football Club changes its name in Vigontina San Paolo Football Club moving te first team in Vigonza and Padova, after the exit of the A.C. Tombolo.

== Colors and badge ==
The team's colors are white and black.

== Name, colors and city ==
- San Paolo Calcio, yellow and blue, 1965–2010 (Padua)
- San Paolo Padova, yellow and blue, 2010–2014 (Padua)
- Atletico San Paolo Padova, yellow and blue, 2014–2015 (Padua)
- Luparense San Paolo, red and blue, 2015–2016 (San Martino di Lupari)
- Vigontina San Paolo, white and black, 2016-2018 (Vigonza/Padova)
- Tombolo Vigontina San Paolo, white and black, 2018-2021 (Tombolo/Vigonza)
- Vigontina San Paolo, white and black, 2021-now (Vigonza/Padova)
