= Tombolo, Veneto =

Tombolo Tónboło (Venetian)
- Comune
- Comune di Tombolo
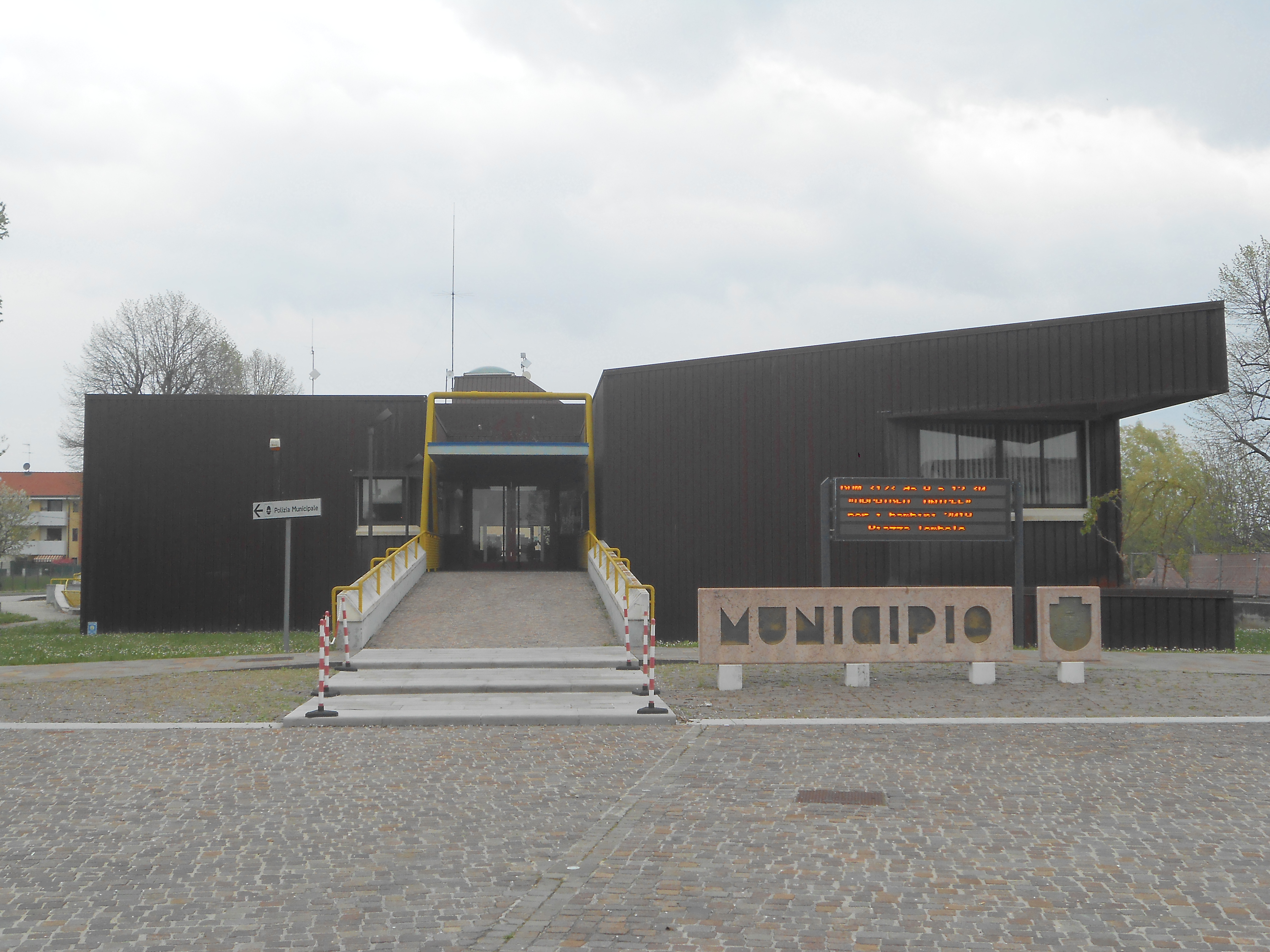
- Town hall

- Coat of arms

- Location within Italy Location within Veneto
- Coordinates: 45°39′N 11°50′E
- Country: Italy
- Region: Veneto
- Province: Padua (PD)
- Frazioni: Onara

Government
  - Mayor: Cristian Andretta

Area
  - Total: 11.1 km^{2} (4.3 sq mi)
- Elevation: 42 m (138 ft)

Population (31 December 2015)
  - Total: 8,352
  - Density: 752/km^{2} (1,950/sq mi)
- Demonym: Tombolani
- Time zone: UTC+1 (CET)
  - Summer (DST): UTC+2 (CEST)
- Postal code: 35019
- Dialing code: 049
- Website: Official website

Tombolo (Venetian: Tónboło) is a comune (municipality) in the Province of Padua in the Italian region Veneto, located about 45 kilometres (28 mi) northwest of Venice and about 25 kilometres (16 mi) north of Padua.

Tombolo borders the following municipalities: Cittadella, Galliera Veneta, San Giorgio in Bosco, San Martino di Lupari, and Villa del Conte. Its frazione of Onara was the seat of the Ezzelini family of Italian medieval lords until 1199; it is also home to a marshy landscape now preserved by a regional park.
