= Tombolo Calcio =

Italian football club

Tombolo
- Full name: Tombolo Calcio
- Founded: 1974-2018; 2018-2021 (youth sector); 2021- (refounded)
- Ground: Stadio comunale, Tombolo, Veneto, Italy
Home colours	Away colours

Tombolo Calcio is an Italian association football club located in Tombolo, Veneto. It currently plays in Prima Categoria.

== History ==
Refounded in 1974, from 1985 to 1989 it played in Serie D. In the 2008–09 Terza Categoria season, the team had under contract, the former Parma, Inter and Juventus player Dino Baggio.

In the 2018–2019 season, the first team merges with Vigontina San Paolo F.C. The company remains active only at the youth sector level.

In the summer of 2021, the Tombolo comes out of Vigontina San Paolo F.C., acquiring the youth sector of the A.C. Tombolo, and renaming the Tombolo Calcio.

== Serie D seasons ==
- 1985–86 Interregionale/C 5th
- 1986–87 Interregionale/C 2nd
- 1987–88 Interregionale/C 10th
- 1988–89 Interregionale/C 3rd

== Colors and badge ==
Its colors are white and red.

== Players ==
- Sergio Cervato 1946–1947 (youth career)
- Dino Baggio 1976–1984 (youth career), 2008–2009
