= Vigodarzere =

- Comune
- Comune di Vigodarzere
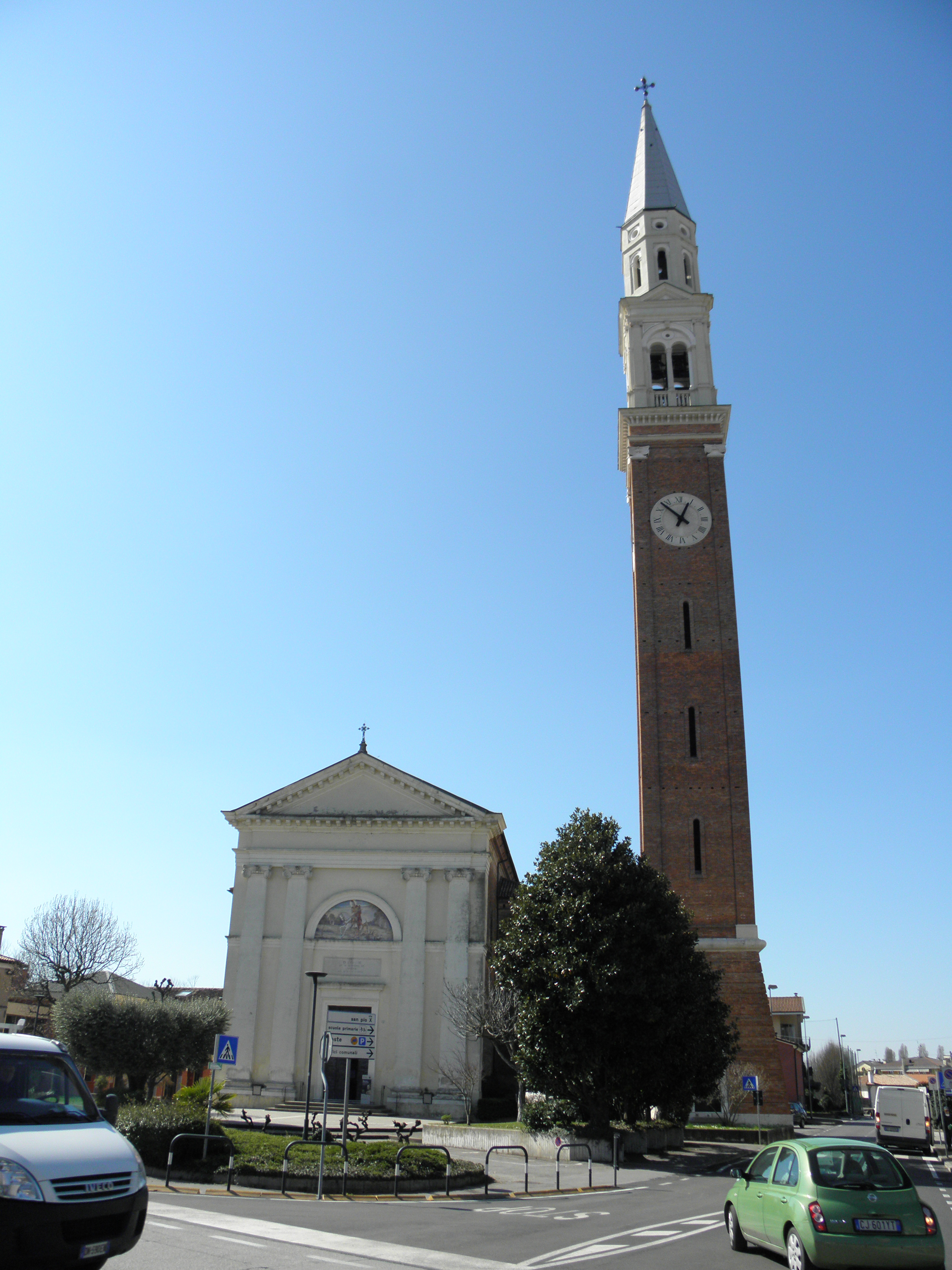
- Church of Saint Martin

- Location within Italy Location within Veneto
- Coordinates: 45°27′N 11°53′E
- Country: Italy
- Region: Veneto
- Province: Padua (PD)
- Frazioni: Saletto, Tavo, Terraglione, Vigodarzere

Government
  - Mayor: Adolfo Zordan

Area
  - Total: 19.9 km^{2} (7.7 sq mi)

Population (November 30, 2018)
  - Total: 13,066
  - Density: 657/km^{2} (1,700/sq mi)
- Demonym: Vigodarzeresi
- Time zone: UTC+1 (CET)
  - Summer (DST): UTC+2 (CEST)
- Postal code: 35010
- Dialing code: 049
- Patron saint: St. Martin of Tours
- Saint day: November 11
- Website: Official website

Vigodarzere is a comune (municipality) in the Province of Padua in the Italian region Veneto, located about 35 kilometres (22 mi) west of Venice and about 4 kilometres (2 mi) northeast of Padua.

Vigodarzere borders the following municipalities: Cadoneghe, Campodarsego, Curtarolo, Limena, Padua, San Giorgio delle Pertiche.
