= Loria, Veneto =

Loria
- Comune
- Comune di Loria

- Location within Italy Location within Veneto
- Coordinates: 45°44′N 11°52′E
- Country: Italy
- Region: Veneto
- Province: Province of Treviso (TV)
- Frazioni: Bessica, Castione, Ramon

Area
  - Total: 23.2 km^{2} (9.0 sq mi)
- Elevation: 70 m (230 ft)

Population (Dec. 2007)
  - Total: 8,749
  - Density: 377/km^{2} (977/sq mi)
- Demonym: Loriati
- Time zone: UTC+1 (CET)
  - Summer (DST): UTC+2 (CEST)
- Postal code: 31037
- Dialing code: 0423
- Patron saint: Bartolomeo
- Saint day: 24-8
- Website: Official website

Loria is a comune (municipality) in the Province of Treviso in the Italian region Veneto, located about 50 kilometres (31 mi) northwest of Venice and about 30 kilometres (19 mi) west of Treviso. As of 31 December 2007, it had a population of 8,749 and an area of 23.2 square kilometres (9.0 mi^{2}).

The municipality of Loria contains the frazioni (subdivisions, mainly villages and hamlets) Bessica, Castione, and Ramon.

Loria borders the following municipalities: Cassola, Castello di Godego, Galliera Veneta, Mussolente, Riese Pio X, Rossano Veneto, San Martino di Lupari, San Zenone degli Ezzelini.

== Demographic evolution ==
Historical population

Year	Pop.	±%
1861	?	—
1871	3,750	—
1881	4,080	+8.8%
1901	4,536	+11.2%
1911	5,390	+18.8%

Year	Pop.	±%
1921	6,145	+14.0%
1931	6,468	+5.3%
1936	6,208	−4.0%
1951	6,971	+12.3%
1961	6,103	−12.5%

Year	Pop.	±%
1971	6,107	+0.1%
1981	6,645	+8.8%
1991	6,987	+5.1%
2001	7,764	+11.1%

Source: Data from ISTAT
