= Galliera Veneta =

- Comune
- Comune di Galliera Veneta
- Location within Italy Location within Veneto
- Coordinates: 45°40′N 11°50′E
- Country: Italy
- Region: Veneto
- Province: Province of Padua (PD)

Area
  - Total: 9.0 km^{2} (3.5 sq mi)

Population (Dec. 2004)
  - Total: 6,830
  - Density: 760/km^{2} (2,000/sq mi)
- Demonym: Gallierani
- Time zone: UTC+1 (CET)
  - Summer (DST): UTC+2 (CEST)
- Postal code: 35015
- Dialing code: 049

Galliera Veneta is a comune (municipality) in the Province of Padua in the Italian region Veneto, located about 45 kilometres (28 miles) northwest of Venice and about 30 km (19 mi) north of Padua. As of 31 December 2004, it had a population of 6,830 and an area of 9.0 square kilometres (3.5 sq mi).

Galliera Veneta borders the following municipalities: Cittadella, Loria, Rossano Veneto, San Martino di Lupari, Tombolo.

== Demographic evolution ==
Historical population

Year	Pop.	±%
1861	?	—
1871	2,907	—
1881	3,243	+11.6%
1901	3,600	+11.0%
1911	4,209	+16.9%

Year	Pop.	±%
1921	4,415	+4.9%
1931	4,586	+3.9%
1936	4,917	+7.2%
1951	5,212	+6.0%
1961	5,236	+0.5%

Year	Pop.	±%
1971	5,779	+10.4%
1981	6,261	+8.3%
1991	6,326	+1.0%
2001	6,614	+4.6%

Source: Data from ISTAT

== Twin towns ==
Galliera Veneta is twinned with:

- Carbonne, France
- Jelenje, Croatia
