= Santa Giustina in Colle =

- Comune
- Comune di Santa Giustina in Colle

- Location within Italy Location within Veneto
- Coordinates: 45°33′50″N 11°54′24″E
- Country: Italy
- Region: Veneto
- Province: Padua (PD)
- Frazioni: Fratte

Government
  - Mayor: Moreno Giacomazzi

Area
  - Total: 17.97 km^{2} (6.94 sq mi)
- Elevation: 24 m (79 ft)

Population (31 August 2021)
  - Total: 7,102
  - Density: 395.2/km^{2} (1,024/sq mi)
- Demonym: Iustinensi
- Time zone: UTC+1 (CET)
  - Summer (DST): UTC+2 (CEST)
- Postal code: 35010
- Dialing code: 049
- Website: Official website

Santa Giustina in Colle is a comune (municipality) in the Province of Padua in the Italian region Veneto, located about 35 kilometres (22 mi) northwest of Venice and about 15 kilometres (9 mi) north of Padua. Santa Giustina in Colle borders the following municipalities: Campo San Martino, Camposampiero, Castelfranco Veneto, Loreggia, San Giorgio delle Pertiche, San Martino di Lupari, Villa del Conte.

Map of comune of Santa Giustina in Colle (province of Padua, region Veneto, Italy)
