= Villa del Conte =

- Comune
- Comune di Villa del Conte
- Coat of arms

- Location within Italy Location within Veneto
- Coordinates: 45°35′N 11°52′E
- Country: Italy
- Region: Veneto
- Province: Padua (PD)
- Frazioni: Abbazia Pisani, Borghetto

Government
  - Mayor: Antonella Argenti

Area
  - Total: 17.3 km^{2} (6.7 sq mi)
- Elevation: 27 m (89 ft)

Population (December 31, 2004)
  - Total: 5,249
  - Density: 303/km^{2} (786/sq mi)
- Demonym: Comitensi
- Time zone: UTC+1 (CET)
  - Summer (DST): UTC+2 (CEST)
- Postal code: 35010
- Dialing code: 049
- Website: Official website

Villa del Conte is a comune (municipality) in the Province of Padua in the Italian region Veneto, located about 40 kilometres (25 mi) northwest of Venice and about 20 kilometres (12 mi) north of Padua.

Villa del Conte borders the following municipalities: Campo San Martino, San Giorgio in Bosco, San Martino di Lupari, Santa Giustina in Colle, Tombolo.

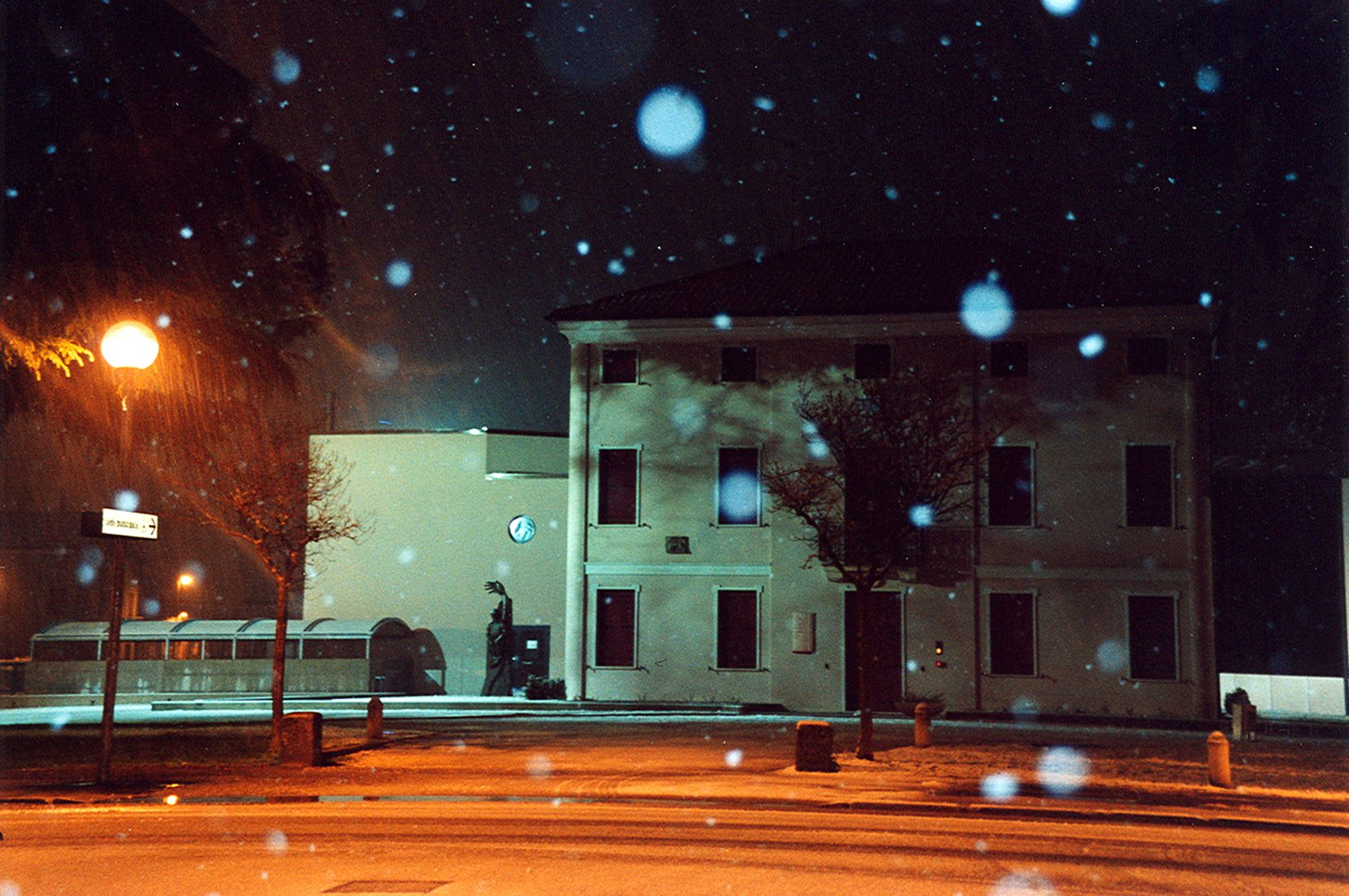
Night view of the Villa del Conte town hall during a snowfall in 2004
