= San Martino di Lupari =

San Martino di Lupari San Martin de Łùpari
- Comune
- Comune di San Martino di Lupari
- Coat of arms

- Location within Italy Location within Veneto
- Coordinates: 45°39′N 11°51′E
- Country: Italy
- Region: Veneto
- Province: Padua (PD)
- Frazioni: Campagnalta, Monastiero, Campretto, Borghetto, Lovari

Government
  - Mayor: Gerry Boratto

Area
  - Total: 24.3 km^{2} (9.4 sq mi)
- Elevation: 40 m (130 ft)

Population (31 December 2015)
  - Total: 13,177
  - Density: 542/km^{2} (1,400/sq mi)
- Demonym: Luparensi or Sammartinari
- Time zone: UTC+1 (CET)
  - Summer (DST): UTC+2 (CEST)
- Postal code: 35018
- Dialing code: 049
- Patron saint: St. Martin
- Website: Official website

San Martino di Lupari (Venetian: San Martin de Łùpari) is a comune (municipality) in the Province of Padua in the Italian region Veneto, located about 45 kilometres (28 mi) northwest of Venice and about 25 kilometres (16 mi) north of Padua.

San Martino di Lupari borders the following municipalities: Castelfranco Veneto, Castello di Godego, Galliera Veneta, Loreggia, Loria, Rossano Veneto, Santa Giustina in Colle, Tombolo, Villa del Conte.

The town is home to a futsal team, the Luparense.
