= Vigonza =

- Comune
- Comune di Vigonza
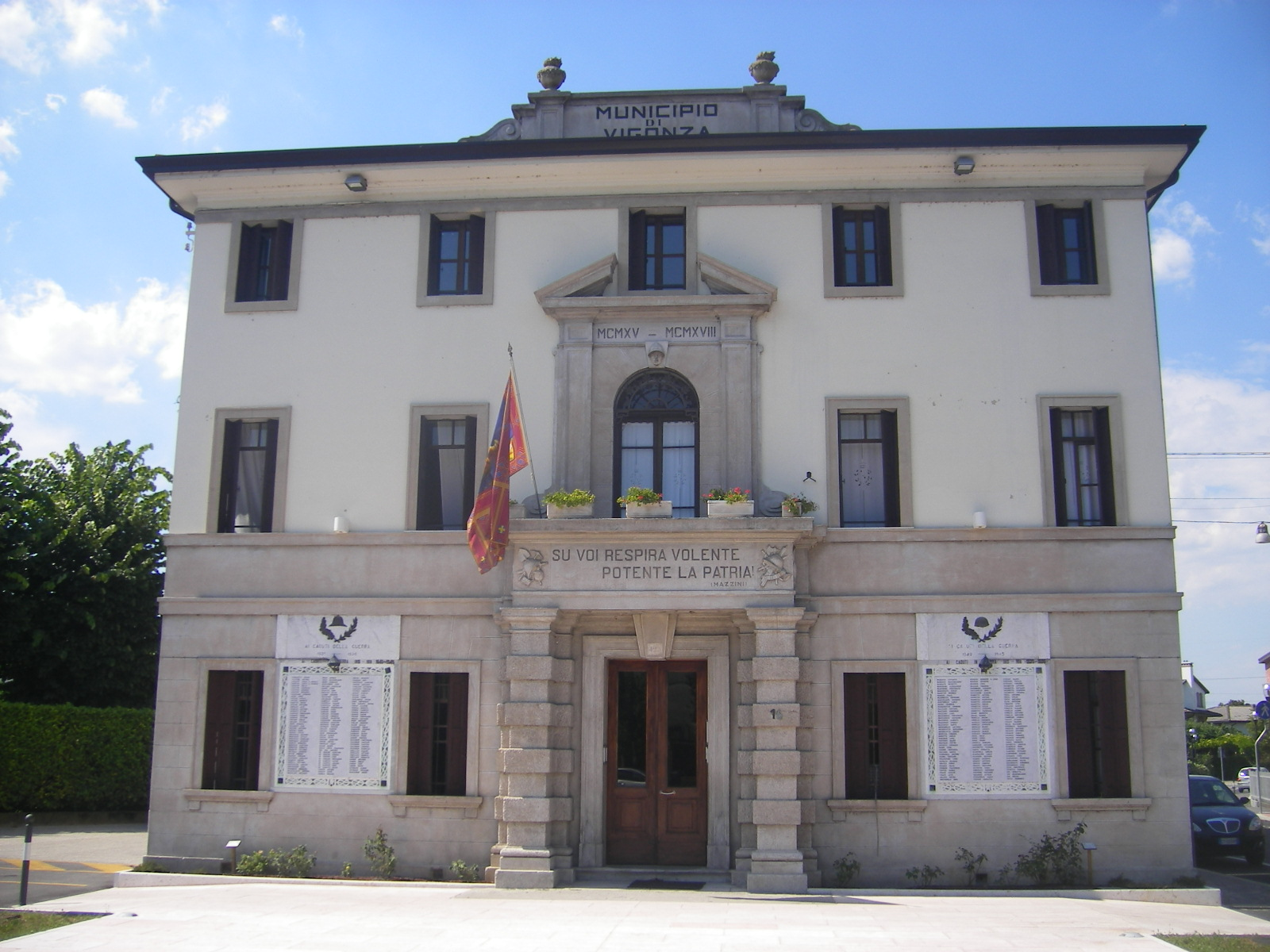
- Town hall

- Coat of arms

- Location within Italy Location within Veneto
- Coordinates: 45°27′N 11°59′E
- Country: Italy
- Region: Veneto
- Province: Province of Padua (PD)
- Frazioni: Busa, Codiverno, Peraga, Perarolo, Pionca, San Vito. Località: Codivernarolo, Battana Prati, Capriccio, Luganega, Barbariga, Carpane, Bagnoli, Santa Maria

Government
  - Mayor: Innocente "Stefano" Marangon (Civic List)

Area
  - Total: 33.3 km^{2} (12.9 sq mi)
- Elevation: 14 m (46 ft)

Population (Dec. 2004)
  - Total: 20,421
  - Density: 613/km^{2} (1,590/sq mi)
- Demonym: Vigontini
- Time zone: UTC+1 (CET)
  - Summer (DST): UTC+2 (CEST)
- Postal code: 35010
- Dialing code: 049
- Website: Official website

Vigonza is a comune (municipality) in the Province of Padua in the Italian region Veneto, located about 25 kilometres (16 mi) west of Venice and about 10 kilometres (6 mi) northeast of Padua. As of 31 December 2004, it had a population of 20,421 and an area of 33.3 square kilometres (12.9 mi^{2}).

The municipality of Vigonza contains the frazioni (subdivisions, mainly villages and hamlets) Busa, Codiverno, Peraga, Perarolo, Pionca, San Vito. Località: Codivernarolo, Battana Prati, Capriccio, Luganega, Barbariga, Carpane, Bagnoli, and Santa Maria.

Vigonza borders the following municipalities: Cadoneghe, Campodarsego, Fiesso d'Artico, Noventa Padovana, Padua, Pianiga, Stra, Villanova di Camposampiero.

== Demographic evolution ==
Historical population

| Year | Pop. | ±% |
|---|---|---|
| 1861 | ? | — |
| 1871 | 4,761 | — |
| 1881 | 5,441 | +14.3% |
| 1901 | 6,612 | +21.5% |
| 1911 | 7,977 | +20.6% |

| Year | Pop. | ±% |
|---|---|---|
| 1921 | 9,154 | +14.8% |
| 1931 | 9,713 | +6.1% |
| 1936 | 10,100 | +4.0% |
| 1951 | 11,067 | +9.6% |
| 1961 | 11,458 | +3.5% |

| Year | Pop. | ±% |
|---|---|---|
| 1971 | 13,843 | +20.8% |
| 1981 | 15,107 | +9.1% |
| 1991 | 16,681 | +10.4% |
| 2001 | 19,458 | +16.6% |

Source: Data from ISTAT
