= Limena =

- Comune
- Comune di Limena
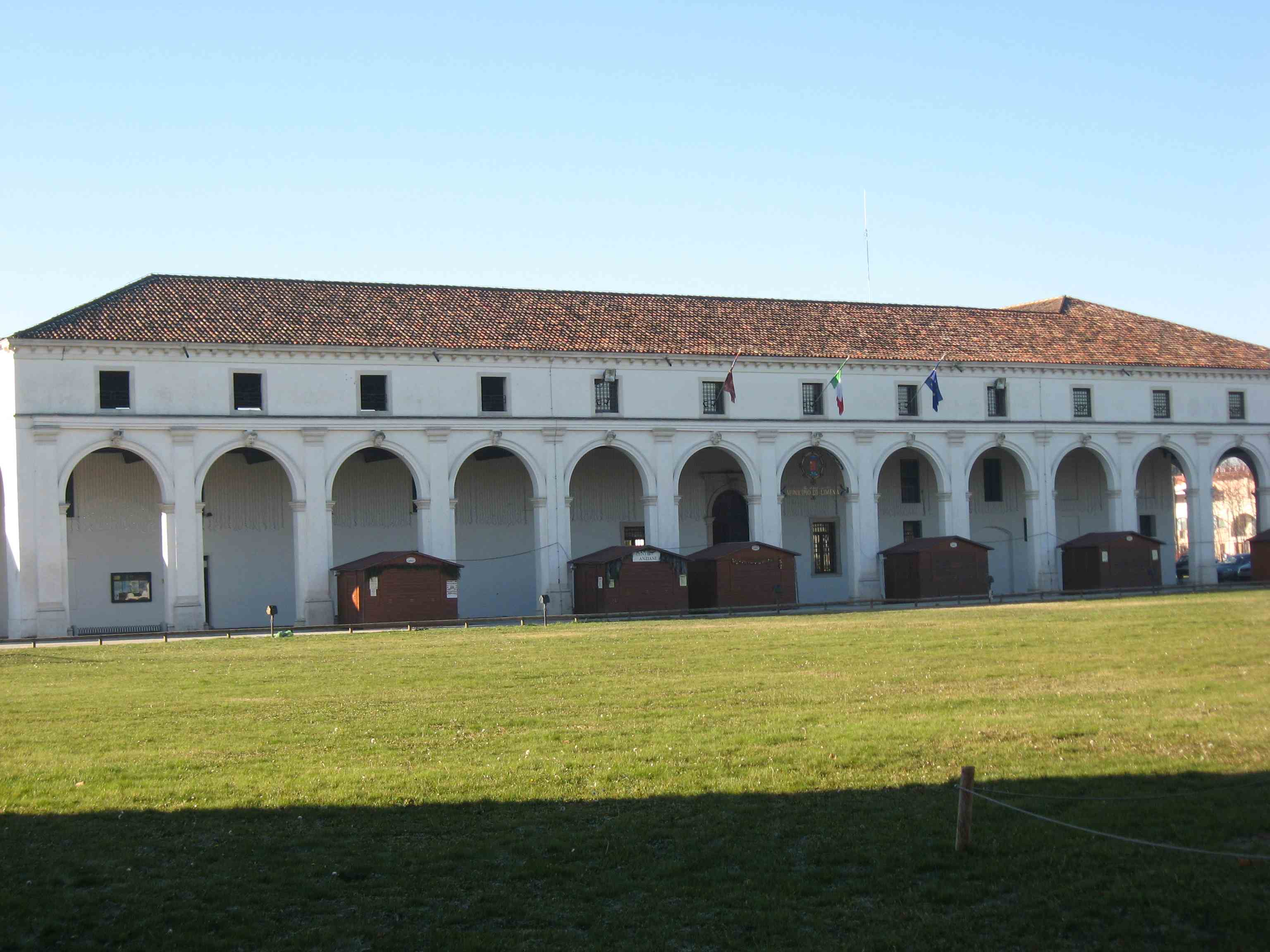

- Location within Italy Location within Veneto
- Coordinates: 45°28′N 11°51′E
- Country: Italy
- Region: Veneto
- Province: Padua (PD)

Government
  - Mayor: Stefano Tonazzo

Area
  - Total: 15.16 km^{2} (5.85 sq mi)
- Elevation: 22 m (72 ft)

Population (31 August 2021)
  - Total: 7,912
  - Density: 521.9/km^{2} (1,352/sq mi)
- Demonym: Limenesi
- Time zone: UTC+1 (CET)
  - Summer (DST): UTC+2 (CEST)
- Postal code: 35010
- Dialing code: 049
- Website: Official website

Limena is a comune (municipality) in the Province of Padua in the Italian region Veneto, located about 35 kilometres (22 mi) west of Venice and about 6 kilometres (4 mi) north of Padua.

Limena borders the following municipalities: Curtarolo, Padua, Piazzola sul Brenta, Vigodarzere, Villafranca Padovana.
