= Piazzola sul Brenta =

- Comune
- Comune di Piazzola sul Brenta
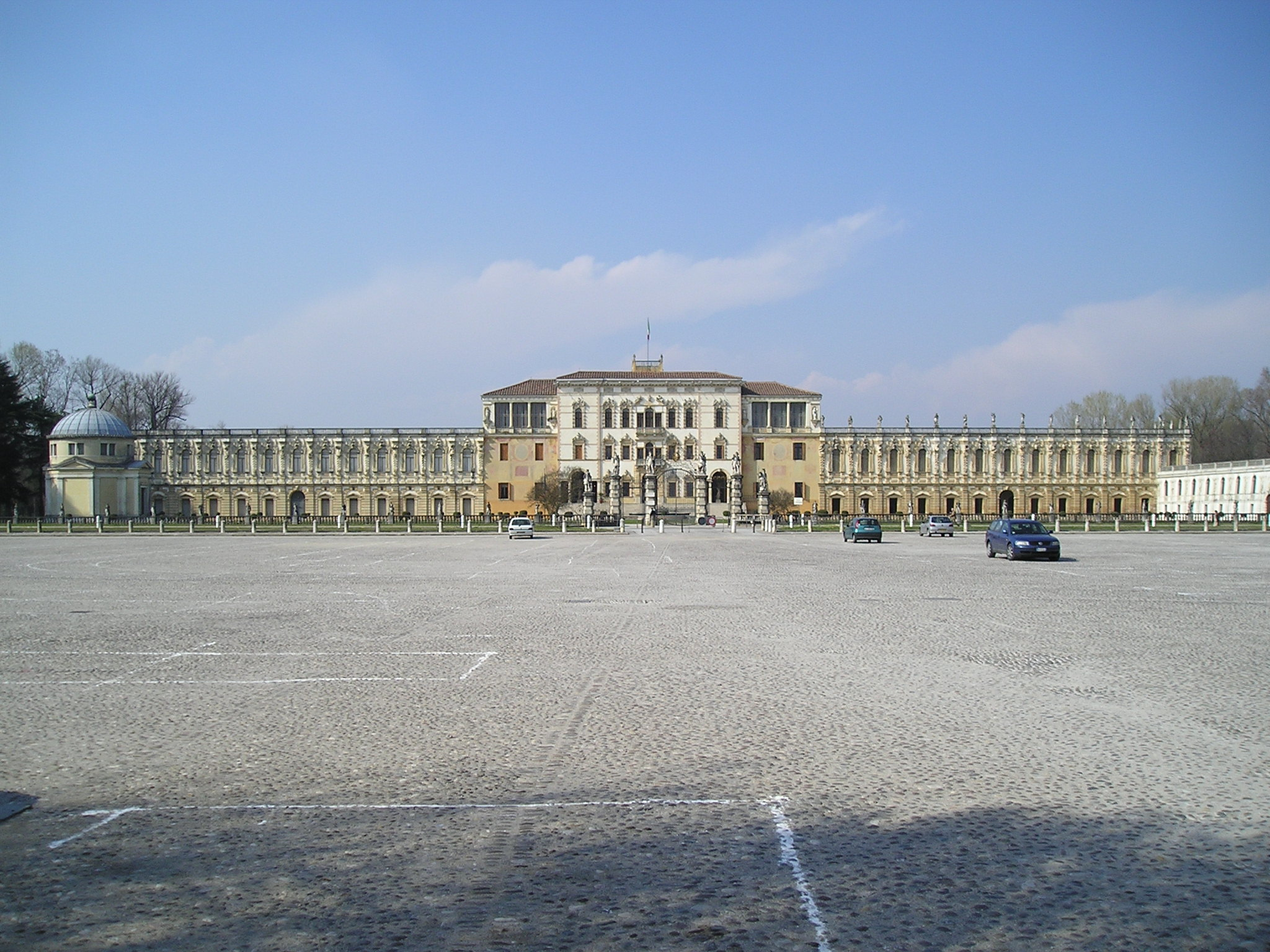
- Villa Contarini

- Location within Italy Location within Veneto
- Coordinates: 45°32′N 11°46′E
- Country: Italy
- Region: Veneto
- Province: Padua (PD)
- Frazioni: Carturo, Isola Mantegna, Presina, Tremignon, Vaccarino

Government
  - Mayor: Valter Milani

Area
  - Total: 40.93 km^{2} (15.80 sq mi)
- Elevation: 13 m (43 ft)

Population (31 August 2021)
  - Total: 11,044
  - Density: 269.8/km^{2} (698.8/sq mi)
- Demonym: Piazzolesi
- Time zone: UTC+1 (CET)
  - Summer (DST): UTC+2 (CEST)
- Postal code: 35016
- Dialing code: 049
- Patron saint: St. Martin
- Saint day: 11 November
- Website: Official website

Piazzola sul Brenta is a comune (municipality) in the Province of Padua in the Italian region Veneto, located about 45 kilometres (28 mi) west of Venice and about 15 kilometres (9 mi) northwest of Padua.

== Main sights ==
- Villa Contarini, begun by Andrea Palladio
- Villa Paccagnella, also attributed to Palladio
- Tempietto of San Benigno.
