= Campodarsego =

- Comune
- Comune di Campodarsego
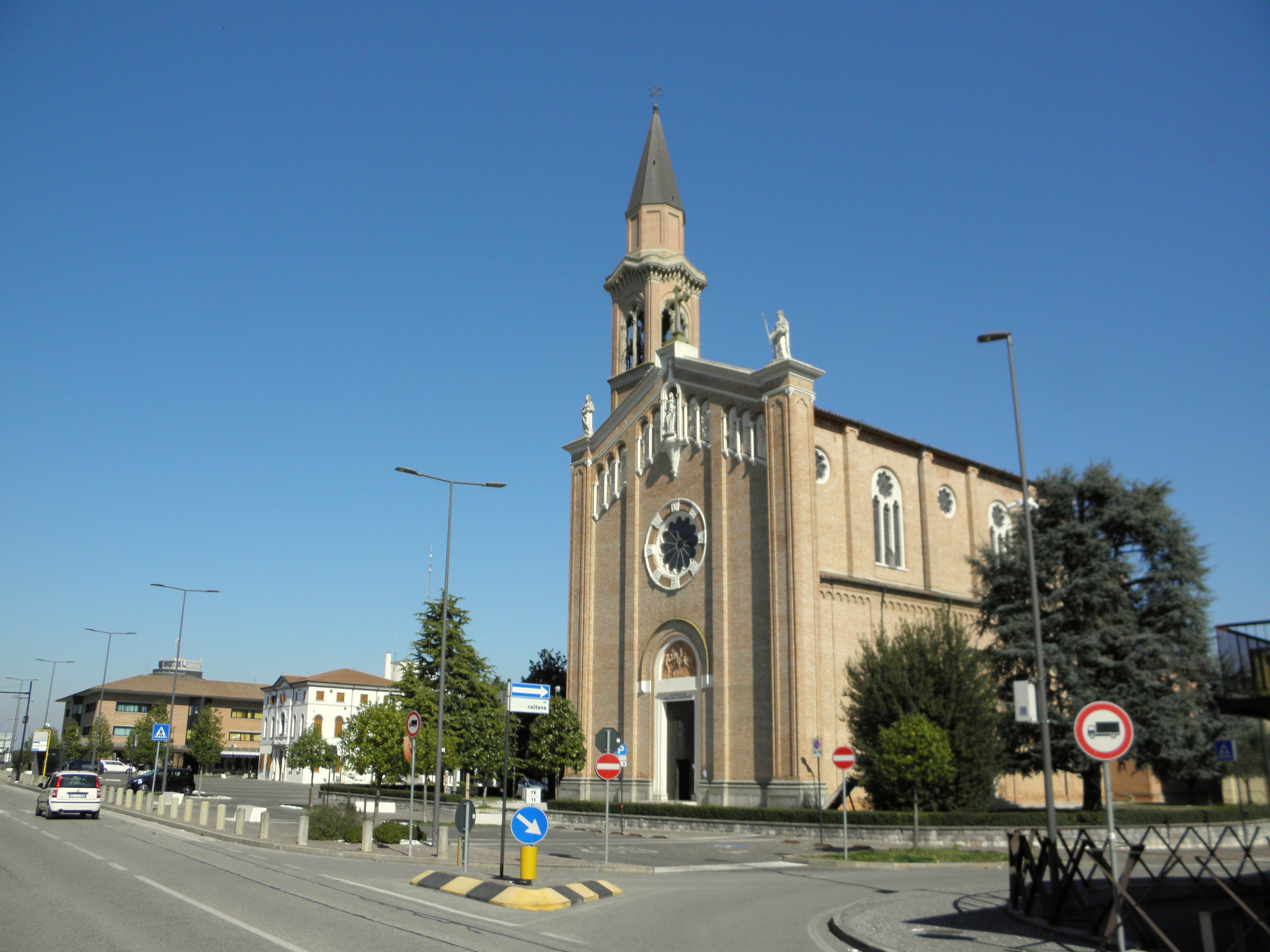

- Coat of arms

- Location within Italy Location within Veneto
- Coordinates: 45°30′N 11°55′E
- Country: Italy
- Region: Veneto
- Province: Padua (PD)
- Frazioni: Sant'Andrea, Bronzola, Fiumicello, Reschigliano, Bosco del Vescovo

Government
  - Mayor: Valter Gallo

Area
  - Total: 25.61 km^{2} (9.89 sq mi)
- Elevation: 17 m (56 ft)

Population (2017)
  - Total: 14,623
  - Density: 571.0/km^{2} (1,479/sq mi)
- Demonym: Campodarseghesi
- Time zone: UTC+1 (CET)
  - Summer (DST): UTC+2 (CEST)
- Postal code: 35011
- Dialing code: 049
- Patron saint: St. Martin
- Saint day: 11 November
- Website: Official website

Campodarsego is a comune (municipality) in the Province of Padua in the Italian region Veneto, located about 30 kilometres (19 mi) west of Venice and about 10 kilometres (6 mi) northeast of Padua. Campodarsego has been recognized as a city and is part of the Camposampierese Municipalities Federation.

== Etymology ==
The first act that mentions Campodarsego dates back to 1190 in which Villa Campi de Arsico is mentioned. The toponym refers to a place that was deforested and made productive near a waterway (Arsicus).
