= List of municipalities of the Province of Padua =

The following is a list of the 101 municipalities (comuni) of the Province of Padua in the region of Veneto in Italy.

== List ==
| Municipality | Population (2026) | Area (km²) | Density |
|---|---|---|---|
| Abano Terme | 20,479 | 21.41 | 956.5 |
| Agna | 3,175 | 18.80 | 168.9 |
| Albignasego | 27,601 | 21.16 | 1,304.4 |
| Anguillara Veneta | 4,076 | 21.67 | 188.1 |
| Arquà Petrarca | 1,781 | 12.52 | 142.3 |
| Arre | 2,089 | 12.34 | 169.3 |
| Arzergrande | 4,841 | 13.64 | 354.9 |
| Bagnoli di Sopra | 3,361 | 34.98 | 96.1 |
| Baone | 3,024 | 24.42 | 123.8 |
| Barbona | 567 | 8.59 | 66.0 |
| Battaglia Terme | 3,869 | 6.23 | 621.0 |
| Boara Pisani | 2,362 | 16.66 | 141.8 |
| Borgo Veneto | 7,045 | 39.18 | 179.8 |
| Borgoricco | 9,084 | 20.39 | 445.5 |
| Bovolenta | 3,394 | 22.78 | 149.0 |
| Brugine | 7,178 | 19.55 | 367.2 |
| Cadoneghe | 15,763 | 12.93 | 1,219.1 |
| Campo San Martino | 5,547 | 13.16 | 421.5 |
| Campodarsego | 15,128 | 25.72 | 588.2 |
| Campodoro | 2,727 | 11.22 | 243.0 |
| Camposampiero | 11,878 | 21.12 | 562.4 |
| Candiana | 2,142 | 22.27 | 96.2 |
| Carmignano di Brenta | 7,546 | 14.68 | 514.0 |
| Cartura | 4,564 | 16.28 | 280.3 |
| Casale di Scodosia | 4,637 | 21.32 | 217.5 |
| Casalserugo | 5,293 | 15.50 | 341.5 |
| Castelbaldo | 1,443 | 15.17 | 95.1 |
| Cervarese Santa Croce | 5,557 | 17.71 | 313.8 |
| Cinto Euganeo | 1,884 | 19.76 | 95.3 |
| Cittadella | 20,047 | 36.68 | 546.5 |
| Codevigo | 6,280 | 70.02 | 89.7 |
| Conselve | 9,993 | 24.29 | 411.4 |
| Correzzola | 5,273 | 42.33 | 124.6 |
| Curtarolo | 7,150 | 14.73 | 485.4 |
| Due Carrare | 8,974 | 26.56 | 337.9 |
| Este | 15,856 | 32.81 | 483.3 |
| Fontaniva | 8,094 | 20.61 | 392.7 |
| Galliera Veneta | 7,165 | 8.95 | 800.6 |
| Galzignano Terme | 4,271 | 18.20 | 234.7 |
| Gazzo | 4,295 | 22.71 | 189.1 |
| Grantorto | 4,435 | 14.10 | 314.5 |
| Granze | 1,873 | 11.47 | 163.3 |
| Legnaro | 9,564 | 14.91 | 641.4 |
| Limena | 8,237 | 15.16 | 543.3 |
| Loreggia | 7,725 | 19.12 | 404.0 |
| Lozzo Atestino | 3,076 | 24.07 | 127.8 |
| Maserà di Padova | 9,261 | 17.58 | 526.8 |
| Masi | 1,823 | 13.77 | 132.4 |
| Massanzago | 6,112 | 13.22 | 462.3 |
| Megliadino San Vitale | 1,821 | 15.25 | 119.4 |
| Merlara | 2,521 | 21.35 | 118.1 |
| Mestrino | 11,953 | 19.22 | 621.9 |
| Monselice | 17,042 | 50.57 | 337.0 |
| Montagnana | 9,193 | 45.03 | 204.2 |
| Montegrotto Terme | 11,628 | 15.37 | 756.5 |
| Noventa Padovana | 11,268 | 7.08 | 1,591.5 |
| Ospedaletto Euganeo | 5,578 | 21.48 | 259.7 |
| Padua | 208,202 | 93.03 | 2,238.0 |
| Pernumia | 3,754 | 13.18 | 284.8 |
| Piacenza d'Adige | 1,285 | 18.49 | 69.5 |
| Piazzola sul Brenta | 11,074 | 40.93 | 270.6 |
| Piombino Dese | 9,550 | 29.63 | 322.3 |
| Piove di Sacco | 20,291 | 35.73 | 567.9 |
| Polverara | 3,428 | 9.84 | 348.4 |
| Ponso | 2,415 | 10.85 | 222.6 |
| Ponte San Nicolò | 13,150 | 13.52 | 972.6 |
| Pontelongo | 3,698 | 10.89 | 339.6 |
| Pozzonovo | 3,455 | 24.48 | 141.1 |
| Rovolon | 4,863 | 27.69 | 175.6 |
| Rubano | 17,243 | 14.51 | 1,188.4 |
| Saccolongo | 5,029 | 13.80 | 364.4 |
| San Giorgio delle Pertiche | 10,092 | 18.86 | 535.1 |
| San Giorgio in Bosco | 6,307 | 28.35 | 222.5 |
| San Martino di Lupari | 13,319 | 24.12 | 552.2 |
| San Pietro in Gu | 4,107 | 17.90 | 229.4 |
| San Pietro Viminario | 2,982 | 13.31 | 224.0 |
| Sant'Angelo di Piove di Sacco | 7,347 | 13.97 | 525.9 |
| Sant'Elena | 2,514 | 8.92 | 281.8 |
| Sant'Urbano | 1,914 | 31.92 | 60.0 |
| Santa Caterina d'Este | 2,319 | 26.89 | 86.2 |
| Santa Giustina in Colle | 7,139 | 17.97 | 397.3 |
| Saonara | 10,877 | 13.54 | 803.3 |
| Selvazzano Dentro | 22,931 | 19.52 | 1,174.7 |
| Solesino | 6,712 | 10.14 | 661.9 |
| Stanghella | 4,165 | 19.81 | 210.2 |
| Teolo | 8,930 | 31.20 | 286.2 |
| Terrassa Padovana | 2,716 | 14.81 | 183.4 |
| Tombolo | 8,184 | 11.02 | 742.6 |
| Torreglia | 6,029 | 18.85 | 319.8 |
| Trebaseleghe | 12,968 | 30.66 | 423.0 |
| Tribano | 4,219 | 19.23 | 219.4 |
| Urbana | 2,016 | 17.02 | 118.4 |
| Veggiano | 4,812 | 16.41 | 293.2 |
| Vescovana | 1,646 | 22.25 | 74.0 |
| Vigodarzere | 13,281 | 19.92 | 666.7 |
| Vigonza | 23,465 | 33.32 | 704.2 |
| Villa del Conte | 5,617 | 17.35 | 323.7 |
| Villa Estense | 2,021 | 16.01 | 126.2 |
| Villafranca Padovana | 10,580 | 23.96 | 441.6 |
| Villanova di Camposampiero | 6,140 | 12.23 | 502.0 |
| Vo' | 3,211 | 20.37 | 157.6 |

== See also ==
- List of municipalities of Veneto
- List of municipalities of Italy
