= ASD Virtus Bagnoli Arre =

Italian football club

A.S.D. Virtus Bagnoli Arre
- Full name: U.S. Bagnoli (1967–2005); U.S.D. Bagnoli San Siro (2005–2009); A.S.D. Bagnoli Calcio 1967 (2009–2018); U.S.D. Arre Bagnoli Candiana ABC (2018–2023)
- Founded: 1967; 58 years ago
- Ground: Stadio Maurizio Sacco, Bagnoli di Sopra, Italy
- League: Promozione
- 2023–24: Promozione Veneto, Group E, 6th of 16
Home colours

A.S.D. Virtus Bagnoli Arre is an Italian association football club located in Bagnoli di Sopra, Veneto and represents the cities of Bagnoli di Sopra, Arre and Candiana.

== History ==
The team was founded in 1967 as U.S. Bagnoli. In the 1984–1985 season, played in Serie D. In the 2005, after the merger between U.S. Bagnoli and San Siro Calcio, changed its name to U.S.D. Bagnoli San Siro. Subsequently, changed its name to A.S.D. Bagnoli Calcio 1967.

In the summer of 2018, the A.S.D. Bagnoli Calcio 1967, merges with Ciaobio Arre football team, creating the new football club, U.S.D. Arre Bagnoli Candiana ABC, which represents the cities of Bagnoli di Sopra, Arre and Candiana.

In May 2023, it merged with the football club, Virtus Cona Agna, giving life to the new club Virtus Bagnoli Arre.

== Colors and badge ==
Its colors are orange.
