= Anguillara =

Anguillara may refer to:

- House of Anguillara, baronial family of Latium
- Anguillara Sabazia, town and comune in the Metropolitan City of Rome, Lazio
- Anguillara Veneta, municipality in the Province of Padua in the Italian region Veneto
