= San Tommaso Apostolo, Albignasego =

Church in the province of Padua, Italy

Coordinates: 45°20′58.38″N 11°51′53.86″E

San Tommaso Apostolo is a Roman Catholic parish church in Albignasego, province of Padua, region of Veneto, Italy.

Prior to 1445, a church was present at the site with an adjacent cemetery; in that year, under the patronage of the marchesi Obizzi, the church underwent refurbishment. The family also helped decorate the main chapel.

By the end of the 19th century, the increase in population had surpassed the capacity of the small church, and construction of a new church was begun in 1890 under the direction of the engineer Zanovello, and completed ten years later. The design is eclectic, and includes a triumphal arch motif, a round oculus, and a rounded portal, all circumscribed by sleek lines recalling the new Stilo Liberty (art-nouveau) style. The apse has frescoes depicting the four evangelists.
