= Cavarzere =

Cavarzere Cavàrzere
- Comune
- Comune di Cavarzere
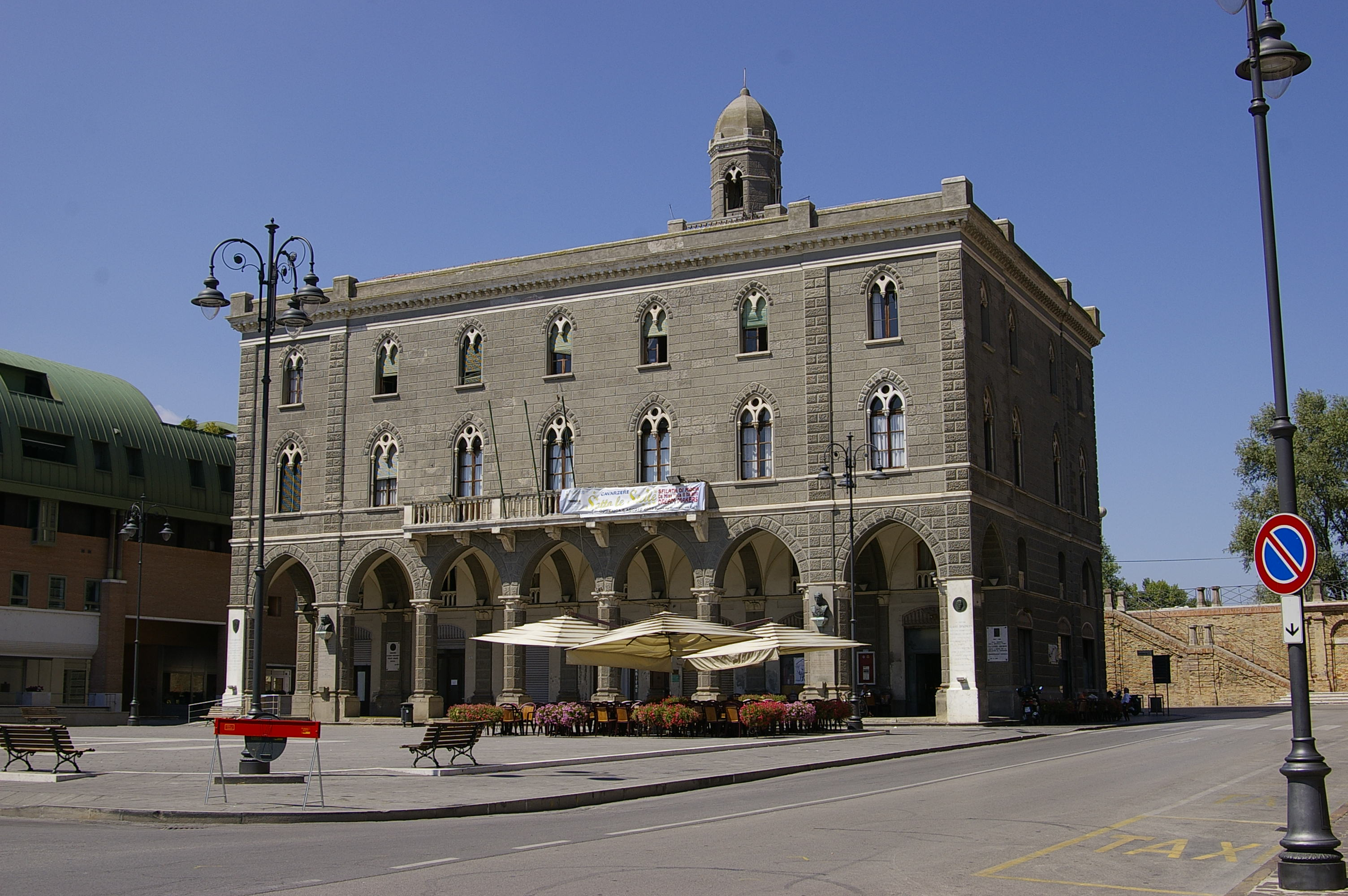
- City Hall of Cavarzere.

- Coat of arms

- Location within Italy Location within Veneto
- Coordinates: 45°8′13.25″N 12°4′57.17″E
- Country: Italy
- Region: Veneto
- Metropolitan city: Venice (VE)
- Frazioni: Boscochiaro, Rottanova, San Pietro, Villaggio Busonera, Bebbe, Grignella, Passetto, Valcerere-Dolfina

Government
  - Mayor: Pierfrancesco Munari

Area
  - Total: 140.44 km^{2} (54.22 sq mi)
- Elevation: 4 m (13 ft)

Population (1 January 2021)
  - Total: 13,139
  - Density: 93.556/km^{2} (242.31/sq mi)
- Demonym: Cavarzerani
- Time zone: UTC+1 (CET)
  - Summer (DST): UTC+2 (CEST)
- Postal code: 30014
- Dialing code: 0426
- Patron saint: Maurus of Parentium
- Saint day: November 22 and March 19
- Website: Official website

Cavarzere (Italian pronunciation: [kaˈvardzere]; Venetian: Cavàrzere) is a comune (municipality) in the Metropolitan City of Venice in the Italian region of Veneto, located about 35 kilometres (22 miles) southwest of Venice.

Neighbouring municipalities of Cavarzere are: Adria, Agna, Anguillara Veneta, Chioggia, Cona, Loreo, Pettorazza Grimani, San Martino di Venezze.

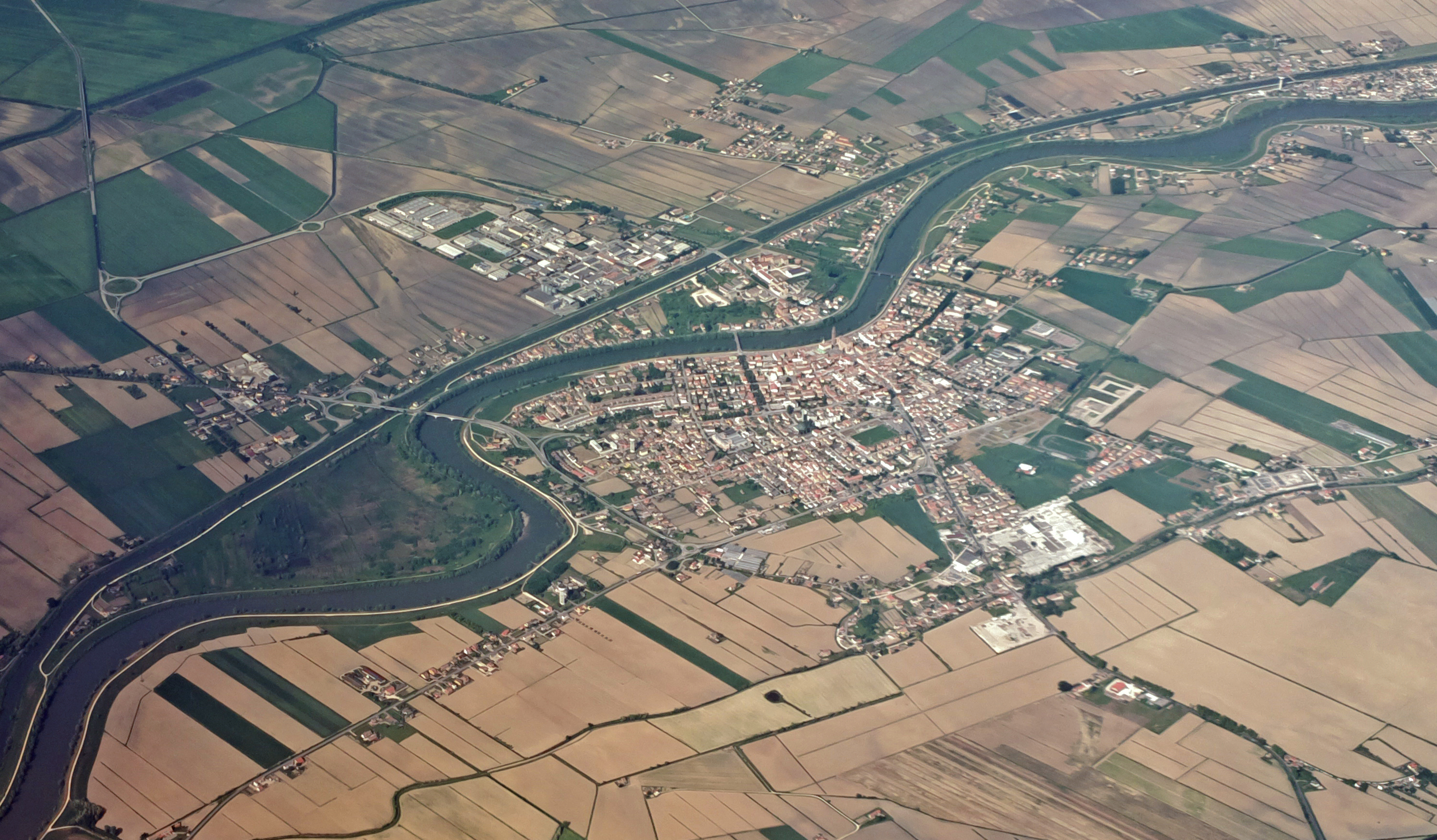
View of Cavarzere

Cavarzere is located on a plain crossed by the Adige and numerous canals.

== History ==
Cavarzere dates from the pre-Roman age as a military outpost of the nearby town of Hatria, the future Adria. The etymology of Cavarzere is from the Latin Caput Aggeris because once it was the only village in the area having an embankment system. After the fall of the Western Roman Empire, it became a refuge for people escaping from barbarian invasion.

For this viable location (along the River Adige and not far from the Venetian Lagoon) as the last town before the Papal States, Cavarzere was destroyed by many artificial floods and invasions by the Lombards, the Genoese, the French and also from the Duchy of Ferrara. Cavarzere followed the fate of the Venetian Republic until the latter was annexed by the Austrian Empire with the Treaty of Campo Formio in 1797. After a brief rule of the Kingdom of Italy (a protectorate of French Empire), with the Congress of Vienna in 1815, Cavarzere was annexed to the Kingdom of Lombardy–Venetia. In 1866 it became part of unified Italy.

== Economy ==
The main economic sector of Cavarzere is agriculture. In the first part of 20th century, Cavarzere grew to become a city with a phase of industrialization. The process was interrupted by the flood of the river Po in 1951. Since that year, the region recorded a continuous decrease in population which reimmigration of these years could not counteract. The modern industrial area is based on manufacturing. Most people, however, commute to neighbouring cities.

== Facilities ==
Cavarzere is served by a bus service providing regular transport to all parts of the area and neighbouring towns, based on a large station. There is also a railway line which connects Adria to Venice having two stops in Cavarzere.

It has a medium school system based on primary and secondary schools and also on professional training institutes. Cavarzere is home to a small hospital belonging to ULSS 14 of Chioggia, a medical outpost named "cittadella socio-sanitaria".

== International relations ==
Cavarzere is twinned with:

- Cassino, Italy, since 1998
- Cugnaux, France, since 2001
- Settimo Torinese, Italy, since 2000
- Valinhos, Brazil, since 2010
