= Warmeriville =

- Commune
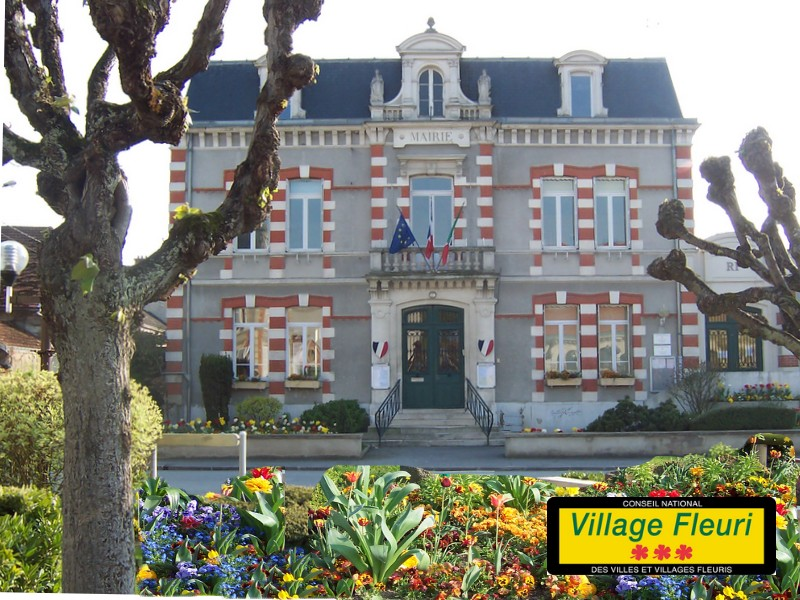
- The town hall in Warmeriville

- Coat of arms
- Location of Warmeriville
- Location within France Location within Grand Est
- Coordinates: 49°21′05″N 4°13′22″E
- Country: France
- Region: Grand Est
- Department: Marne
- Arrondissement: Reims
- Canton: Bourgogne-Fresne
- Intercommunality: Grand Reims

Government
  - Mayor (2020–2026): Patrice Mousel
- Area^{1}: 23.25 km^{2} (8.98 sq mi)
- Elevation: 80 m (260 ft)
- Highest elevation: 151 m (495 ft)
- Lowest elevation: 76 m (249 ft)
- Population (2023): 2,749
  - Density: 118.2/km^{2} (306.2/sq mi)
- Time zone: UTC+01:00 (CET)
  - Summer (DST): UTC+02:00 (CEST)
- INSEE/Postal code: 51660 /51110
- ^{1} French Land Register data, which excludes lakes, ponds, glaciers > 1 km^{2} (0.386 sq mi or 247 acres) and river estuaries.

Warmeriville (French pronunciation: [vaʁməʁivil]) is a commune in the Marne department in north-eastern France.

== Geography ==
The commune is traversed by the Suippe river.

== Population ==
Historical population
Year	Pop.	±% p.a.
1968	1,375	—
1975	1,240	−1.47%
1982	1,517	+2.92%
1990	2,151	+4.46%
1999	2,156	+0.03%
2007	2,145	−0.06%
2012	2,187	+0.39%
2017	2,468	+2.45%
2023	2,749	+1.81%
Source: INSEE

== Twin towns ==
Warmeriville is twinned with:

- Arre, Veneto, Italy

== See also ==
- Communes of the Marne department
