= Correzzola =

- Comune
- Comune di Correzzola
- Location within Italy Location within Veneto
- Coordinates: 45°14′N 12°4′E
- Country: Italy
- Region: Veneto
- Province: Province of Padua (PD)

Area
  - Total: 42.5 km^{2} (16.4 sq mi)

Population (Dec. 2004)
  - Total: 5,506
  - Density: 130/km^{2} (336/sq mi)
- Time zone: UTC+1 (CET)
  - Summer (DST): UTC+2 (CEST)
- Postal code: 35020
- Dialing code: 049

Correzzola is a comune (municipality) in the Province of Padua in the Italian region Veneto, located about 30 kilometres (19 mi) southwest of Venice and about 25 kilometres (16 mi) southeast of Padua. As of 31 December 2004, it had a population of 5,506 and an area of 42.5 square kilometres (16.4 mi^{2}).

Correzzola borders the following municipalities: Agna, Candiana, Chioggia, Codevigo, Cona, Pontelongo.

== Demographic evolution ==
Historical population

Year	Pop.	±%
1861	?	—
1871	3,779	—
1881	4,378	+15.9%
1901	5,029	+14.9%
1911	5,846	+16.2%

Year	Pop.	±%
1921	6,929	+18.5%
1931	8,819	+27.3%
1936	9,458	+7.2%
1951	8,965	−5.2%
1961	6,000	−33.1%

Year	Pop.	±%
1971	5,133	−14.4%
1981	5,055	−1.5%
1991	5,195	+2.8%
2001	5,310	+2.2%

Source: Data from ISTAT
