= Maserà di Padova =

- Comune
- Comune di Maserà di Padova
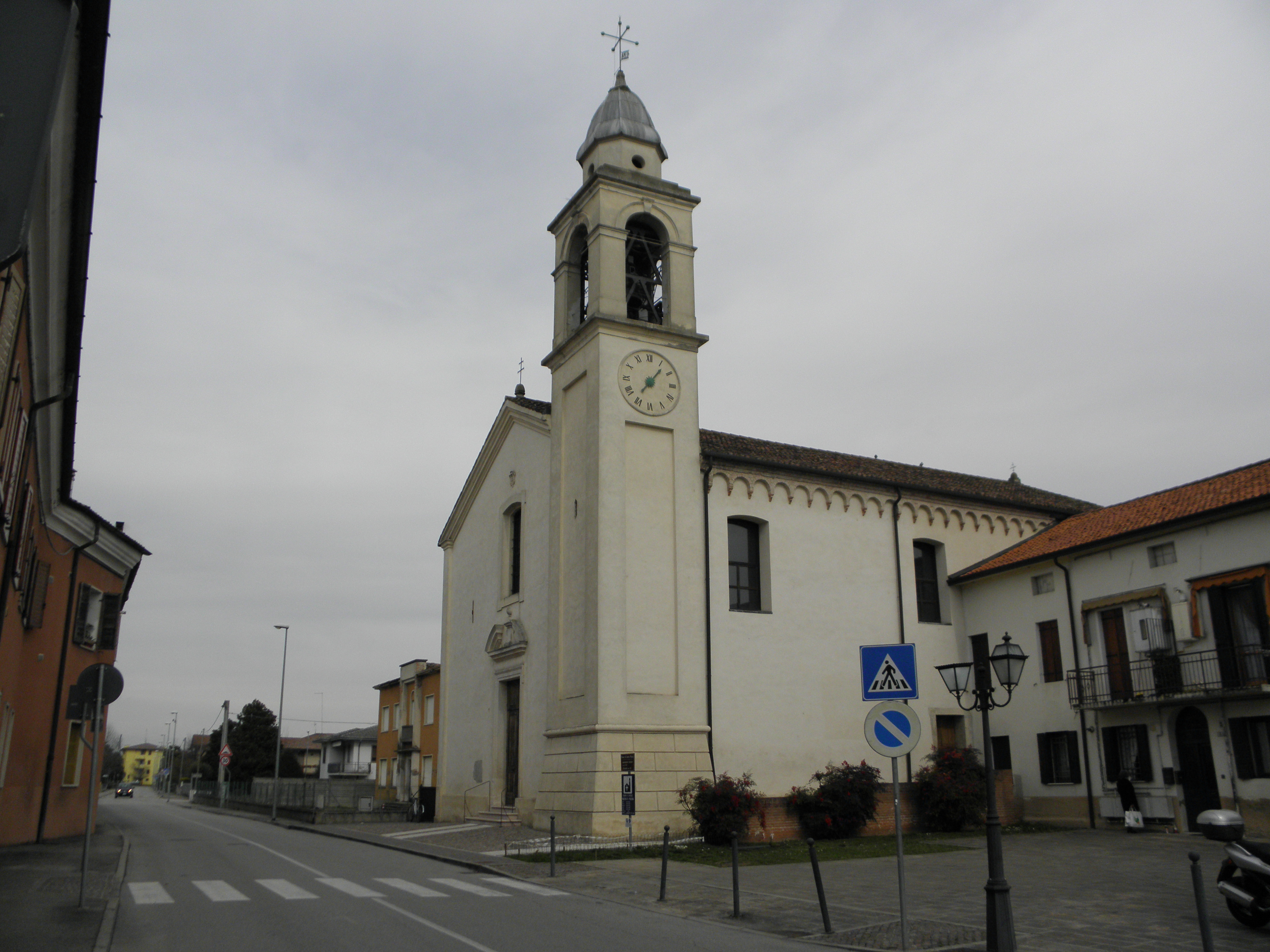

- Location within Italy Location within Veneto
- Coordinates: 45°19′N 11°52′E
- Country: Italy
- Region: Veneto
- Province: Province of Padua (PD)
- Frazioni: Bertipaglia

Government
  - Mayor: Gabriele Volponi

Area
  - Total: 17.58 km^{2} (6.79 sq mi)
- Elevation: 9 m (30 ft)

Population (1-1-2023)
  - Total: 9,126
  - Density: 519.1/km^{2} (1,344/sq mi)
- Demonym: Maseratensi
- Time zone: UTC+1 (CET)
  - Summer (DST): UTC+2 (CEST)
- Postal code: 35020
- Dialing code: 049
- Patron saint: Nativity of the Virgin Mary
- Saint day: 8 September

Maserà di Padova is a comune (municipality) in the Province of Padua in the Italian region of Veneto, located about 40 kilometres (25 mi) southwest of Venice and about 11 kilometres (7 mi) south of Padua. As of 1 January 2023, it had a population of 9,126 and an area of 17.58 square kilometres (6.79 mi^{2}).

Maserà di Padova borders the following municipalities: Abano Terme, Albignasego, Cartura, Casalserugo, Due Carrare.

Giorgio Perlasca, Righteous Among the Nations, grew up in Maserà.

== Demographic evolution ==
Historical population

Year	Pop.	±%
1861	?	—
1871	2,437	—
1881	2,673	+9.7%
1901	3,034	+13.5%
1911	3,600	+18.7%

Year	Pop.	±%
1921	4,099	+13.9%
1931	4,492	+9.6%
1936	4,604	+2.5%
1951	5,145	+11.8%
1961	4,660	−9.4%

Year	Pop.	±%
1971	4,866	+4.4%
1981	5,407	+11.1%
1991	6,457	+19.4%
2001	7,695	+19.2%
2023	9,126	+18.6%

Source: Data from ISTAT

== Twin towns ==
Tura, Hungary (2004)
