= Cartura =

- Comune
- Comune di Cartura
- Location within Italy Location within Veneto
- Coordinates: 45°16′9″N 11°51′28″E
- Country: Italy
- Region: Veneto
- Province: Province of Padua (PD)
- Frazioni: Cagnola, Gorgo

Area
  - Total: 16.2 km^{2} (6.3 sq mi)

Population (Dec. 2004)
  - Total: 4,268
  - Density: 263/km^{2} (682/sq mi)
- Time zone: UTC+1 (CET)
  - Summer (DST): UTC+2 (CEST)
- Postal code: 35025
- Dialing code: 049

Cartura is a comune (municipality) in the Province of Padua in the Italian region Veneto, located about 40 kilometres (25 mi) southwest of Venice and about 15 kilometres (9 mi) south of Padua. As of 31 December 2004, it had a population of 4,268 and an area of 16.2 square kilometres (6.3 mi^{2}).

The municipality of Cartura contains the frazioni (subdivisions, mainly villages and hamlets) Cagnola and Gorgo.

Cartura borders the following municipalities: Bovolenta, Casalserugo, Conselve, Due Carrare, Maserà di Padova, Pernumia, San Pietro Viminario, Terrassa Padovana.

== History ==
The first settlements in the territory of the present-day municipality of Cartura date back to the first century A.D., a period when the first land drainage works were carried out by the Romans in the territory, which was then marshy and covered with forests. The first inhabitants were Romans and the name of the town itself is probably linked to the Latin term 'cartorian' which was imprinted in building material, as confirmed by the discovery of an ancient brick and tile factory.

With the fall of the Western Roman Empire came a period of decline and abandonment of the area.

In 1324, Cangrande della Scala wanted to conquer the city of Padua and to achieve his aim he planned on destroying the land around the city to interrupt the production of supplies. During that campaign, also Cartura was set on fire and many people were killed. This episode led to poverty and demographic decline.

In the 16th century Venice subdued the region and a period of poverty, hunger and oppression began for the population. Almost all the products had to be sent as taxes to Venice and little was left for the people's own nourishment and survival. During their dominion, the Venetians showed themselves to be indifferent to the fate of the rural populations. However, after a century and a half of ineffective and negative domination, Venice itself realised that a discrete agricultural economy could also be of benefit to it in terms of military defence and so it began a new drainage project in Cartura from 1556, with the construction of a large artificial drainage system that still exists today under the name of 'Fossa Paltana'. This led to a stationary situation during the end of 16th and 17th centuries.

During the end of the 18th and beginning of 19th century the power upon the territory passed from the French to the Austrian Empire. In spring 1797 the French conquered the region and forced the population to follow certain measures that included the payment of heavy taxes and requisitions. However, on 17 October 1797, with the Treaty of Campoformio, the Veneto region was taken over by the Austrians. Their domination lasted eight years but proved to be positive for the poor economy of the territory. One of the positive aspects was the new political proximity with Lombardy region that brought the Veneto region out of economic isolation; secondly, the Austrian economic recovery and administrative restructuring plan. This plan was stopped by the conquer of the region by the Napoleonic empire. This period of French domination, that went from 1805 to 1813, was characterised by compulsory conscription, taxation and expropriation of land, leaving the population once again in poverty. Finally, with the Congress of Vienna of 1814, the region went back to the Austrian Empire, which marked the economic recovery of the area. In Cartura in particular, silkworm breeding brought great benefits, especially thanks to trade with Lombardy, where there were textile industries that needed the material.

Austrian rule ended with the entry of the Veneto region into the Kingdom of Italy in 1866. For Cartura and that area in particular this meant once again poverty, but also moral decline e criminality. Cartura's economic recovery occurred in the inter-war period, after the First World War had highlighted the backwardness of its population and economy. The first electrical system was installed in 1927 and then, in 1928, the electric tramway was built, connecting Cartura with Padua and Conselve.

Cartura sent men to the war field also during the Second World War and was part of the Italian Partisan movement. Cartura was also a victim of Anglo-American bombing, which resulted in the destruction of the church of Cagnola and not the bridge, which was the target. On the 25 and 26 April 1945, all roads in Cartura were used by retreating German tanks and the bridge, which was not destroyed, enabled them to escape.

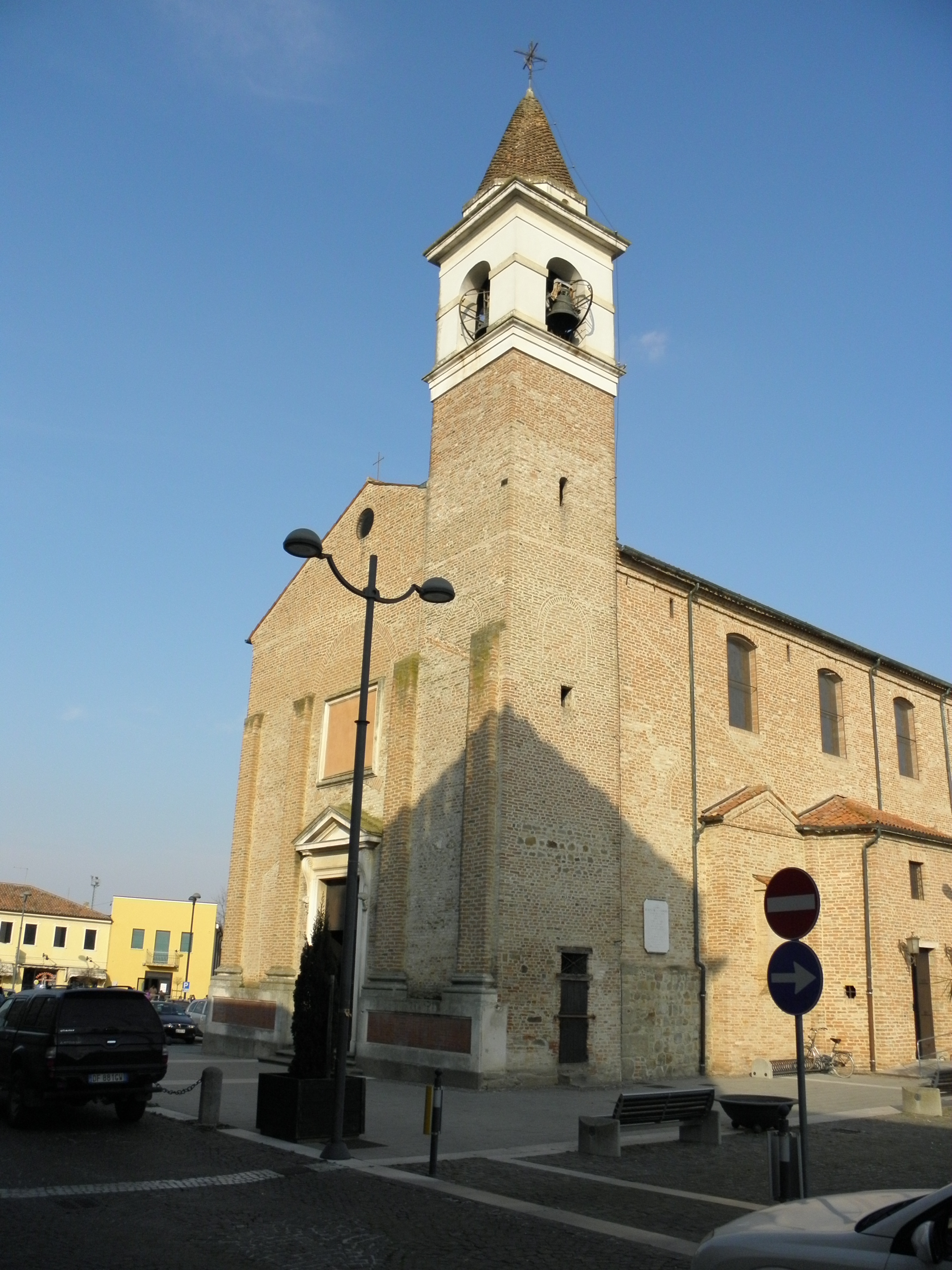
Church Santa Maria Assunta, Cartura

Today, the economic structure of the municipality is mainly made up of agricultural activities, alongside the presence of mainly family-run craft businesses.

== Demographic evolution ==
Historical population

Year	Pop.	±%
1861	?	—
1871	2,499	—
1881	2,684	+7.4%
1901	2,850	+6.2%
1911	3,270	+14.7%

Year	Pop.	±%
1921	3,712	+13.5%
1931	4,091	+10.2%
1936	4,236	+3.5%
1951	4,675	+10.4%
1961	3,944	−15.6%

Year	Pop.	±%
1971	4,005	+1.5%
1981	4,022	+0.4%
1991	4,101	+2.0%
2001	4,075	−0.6%

Source: Data from ISTAT
