= Brugine =

- Comune
- Comune di Brugine
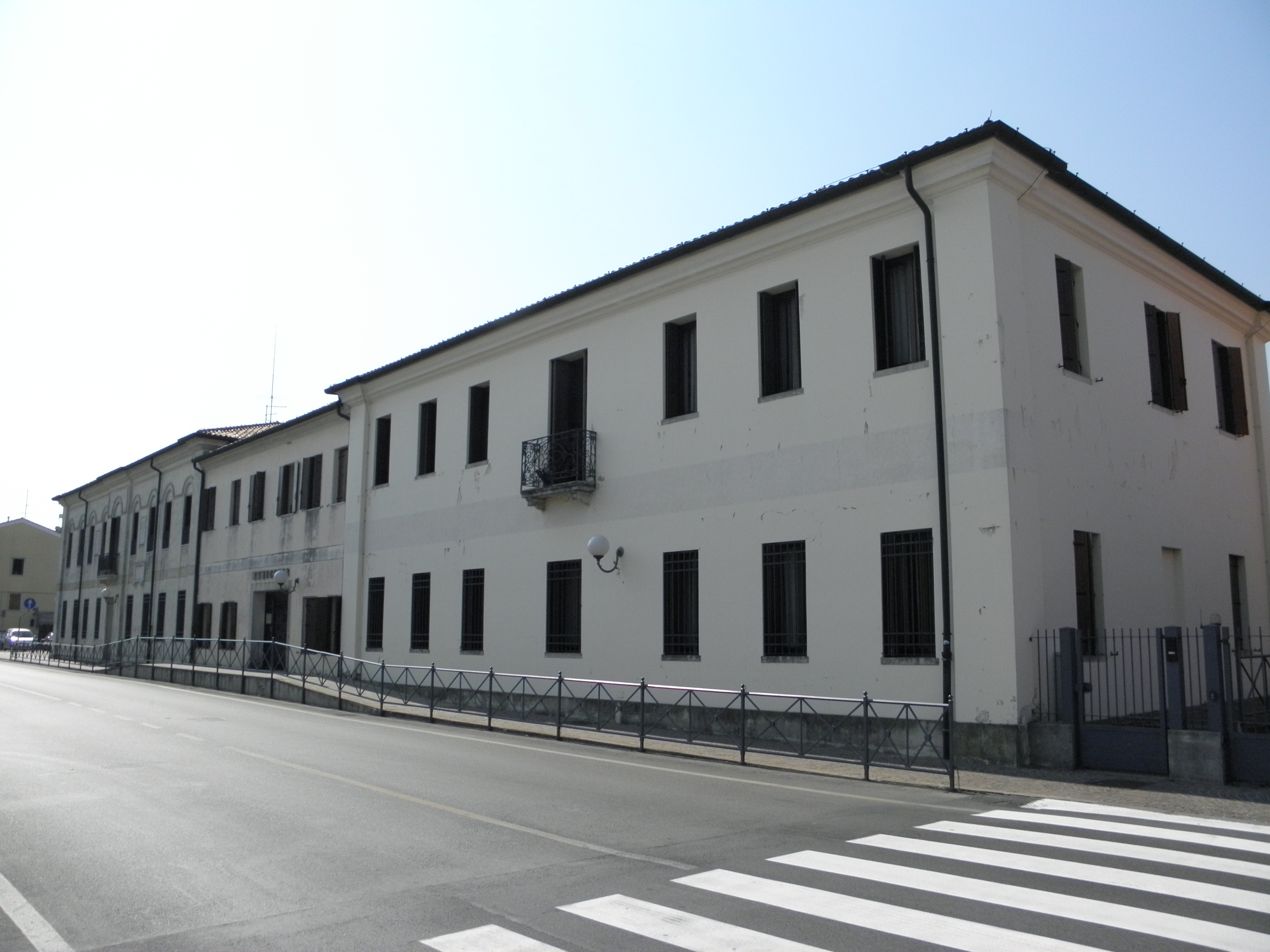
- Town hall

- Location within Italy Location within Veneto
- Coordinates: 45°17′55″N 11°59′34″E
- Country: Italy
- Region: Veneto
- Province: Province of Padua (PD)
- Frazioni: Campagnola

Area
  - Total: 19.6 km^{2} (7.6 sq mi)
- Elevation: 7 m (23 ft)

Population (Dec. 2004)
  - Total: 6,579
  - Density: 336/km^{2} (869/sq mi)
- Demonym: Bruginesi
- Time zone: UTC+1 (CET)
  - Summer (DST): UTC+2 (CEST)
- Postal code: 35020
- Dialing code: 049
- Website: Official website

Brugine is a comune (municipality) in the Province of Padua in the Italian region Veneto, located about 40 km (25 miles) west of Venice and about 16 km (10 miles) southeast of Padua. As of 31 December 2004, it had a population of 6,579 and an area of 19.6 km^{2} (7.6 sq mi).

The municipality of Brugine contains the frazione (subdivision) Campagnola.

Brugine borders the following municipalities: Bovolenta, Legnaro, Piove di Sacco, Polverara, Pontelongo, Sant'Angelo di Piove di Sacco. In Brugine was born an Italian clothing designer Renzo Rosso.

== Demographic evolution ==
Historical population

Year	Pop.	±%
1861	?	—
1871	3,411	—
1881	3,697	+8.4%
1901	3,978	+7.6%
1911	4,683	+17.7%

Year	Pop.	±%
1921	5,456	+16.5%
1931	6,012	+10.2%
1936	6,106	+1.6%
1951	5,373	−12.0%
1961	4,430	−17.6%

Year	Pop.	±%
1971	4,186	−5.5%
1981	4,612	+10.2%
1991	5,225	+13.3%
2001	6,107	+16.9%

Source: Data from ISTAT
