= Due Carrare =

- Comune
- Comune di Due Carrare
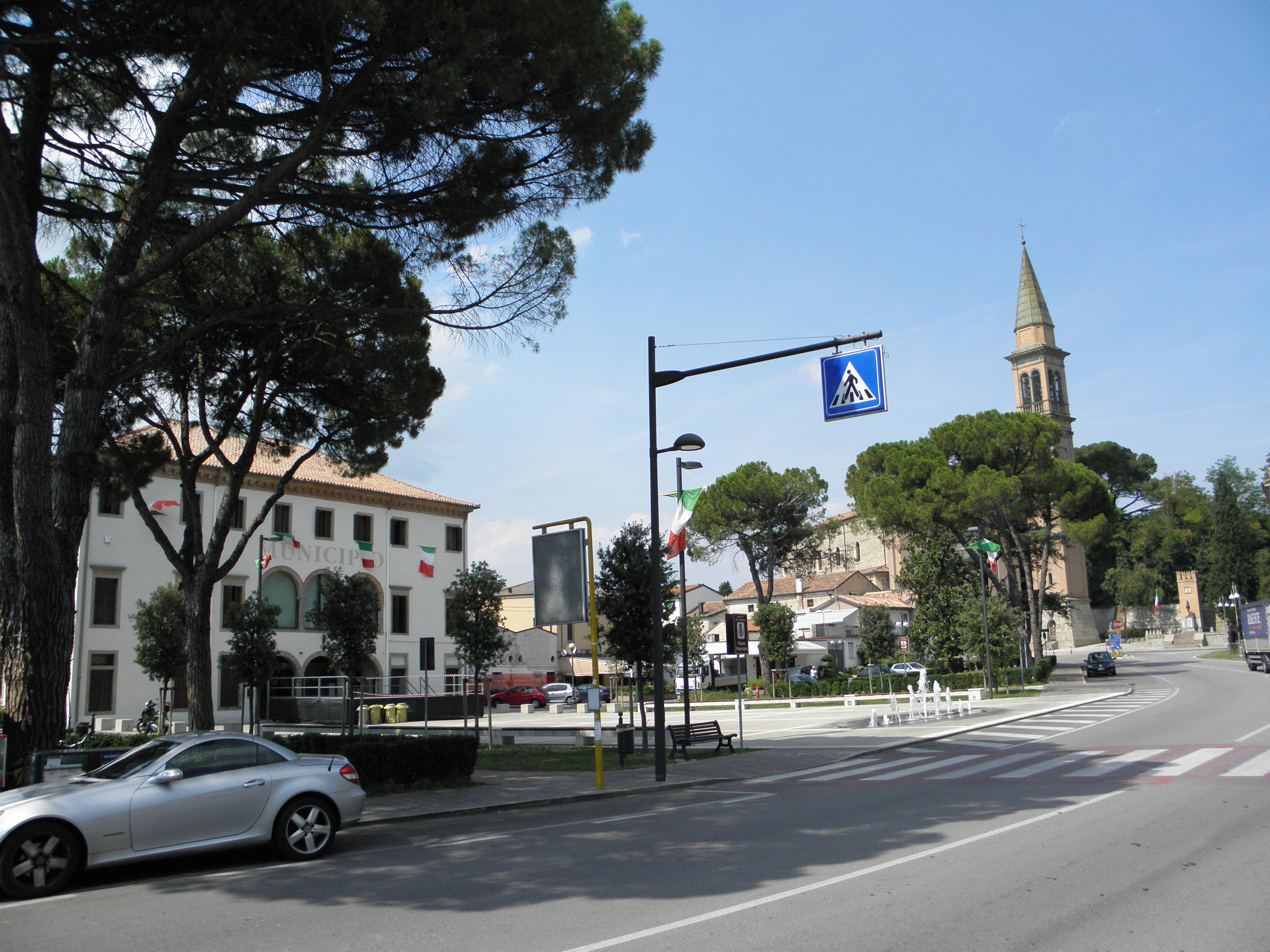
- Piazza del Municipio (Town hall square) and Via Roma in Carrara San Giorgio

- Coat of arms

- Location within Italy Location within Veneto
- Coordinates: 45°17′N 11°50′E
- Country: Italy
- Region: Veneto
- Province: Padua (PD)
- Frazioni: Cornegliana, Terradura

Government
  - Mayor: Sergio Vason

Area
  - Total: 26.6 km^{2} (10.3 sq mi)
- Elevation: 8 m (26 ft)

Population (28 February 2010)
  - Total: 8,923
  - Density: 335/km^{2} (869/sq mi)
- Demonym: Carraresi
- Time zone: UTC+1 (CET)
  - Summer (DST): UTC+2 (CEST)
- Postal code: 35020
- Dialing code: 049
- Website: Official website

Due Carrare is a comune (municipality) in the Province of Padua in the Italian region Veneto, located about 40 kilometres (25 mi) southwest of Venice and about 15 kilometres (9 mi) south of Padua.

This municipality is the result of the merging of two different municipalities (Carrara San Giorgio and Carrara Santo Stefano), voted by the inhabitants on 26 February 1995 and allowed by the consequent regional law on 21 March 1995.

Due Carrare borders the following municipalities: Abano Terme, Battaglia Terme, Cartura, Maserà di Padova, Montegrotto Terme, Pernumia.

The city is the birthplace of the Carraresi family, who ruled Padua in the late Middle Ages.

== See also ==
- Carraresi
