= Pontelongo =

- Comune
- Comune di Pontelongo
- Location within Italy Location within Veneto
- Coordinates: 45°15′N 12°1′E
- Country: Italy
- Region: Veneto
- Province: Province of Padua (PD)

Government
  - Mayor: Roberto Franco

Area
  - Total: 10.8 km^{2} (4.2 sq mi)

Population (Dec. 2004)
  - Total: 3,853
  - Density: 357/km^{2} (924/sq mi)
- Time zone: UTC+1 (CET)
  - Summer (DST): UTC+2 (CEST)
- Postal code: 35029
- Dialing code: 049
- Website: Official website

Pontelongo is a comune (municipality) in the Province of Padua in the Italian region Veneto, located about 30 kilometres (19 mi) southwest of Venice and about 20 kilometres (12 mi) southeast of Padua. As of 31 December 2004, it had a population of 3,853 and an area of 10.8 square kilometres (4.2 mi^{2}).

Pontelongo borders the following municipalities: Arzergrande, Bovolenta, Brugine, Candiana, Codevigo, Correzzola, Piove di Sacco.

== Demographic evolution ==
Historical population

Year	Pop.	±%
1861	?	—
1871	2,130	—
1881	2,365	+11.0%
1901	2,230	−5.7%
1911	2,857	+28.1%

Year	Pop.	±%
1921	3,466	+21.3%
1931	4,531	+30.7%
1936	4,809	+6.1%
1951	5,075	+5.5%
1961	4,164	−18.0%

Year	Pop.	±%
1971	3,713	−10.8%
1981	3,566	−4.0%
1991	3,571	+0.1%
2001	3,759	+5.3%

Source: Data from ISTAT
