= Pernumia =

- Comune
- Comune di Pernumia
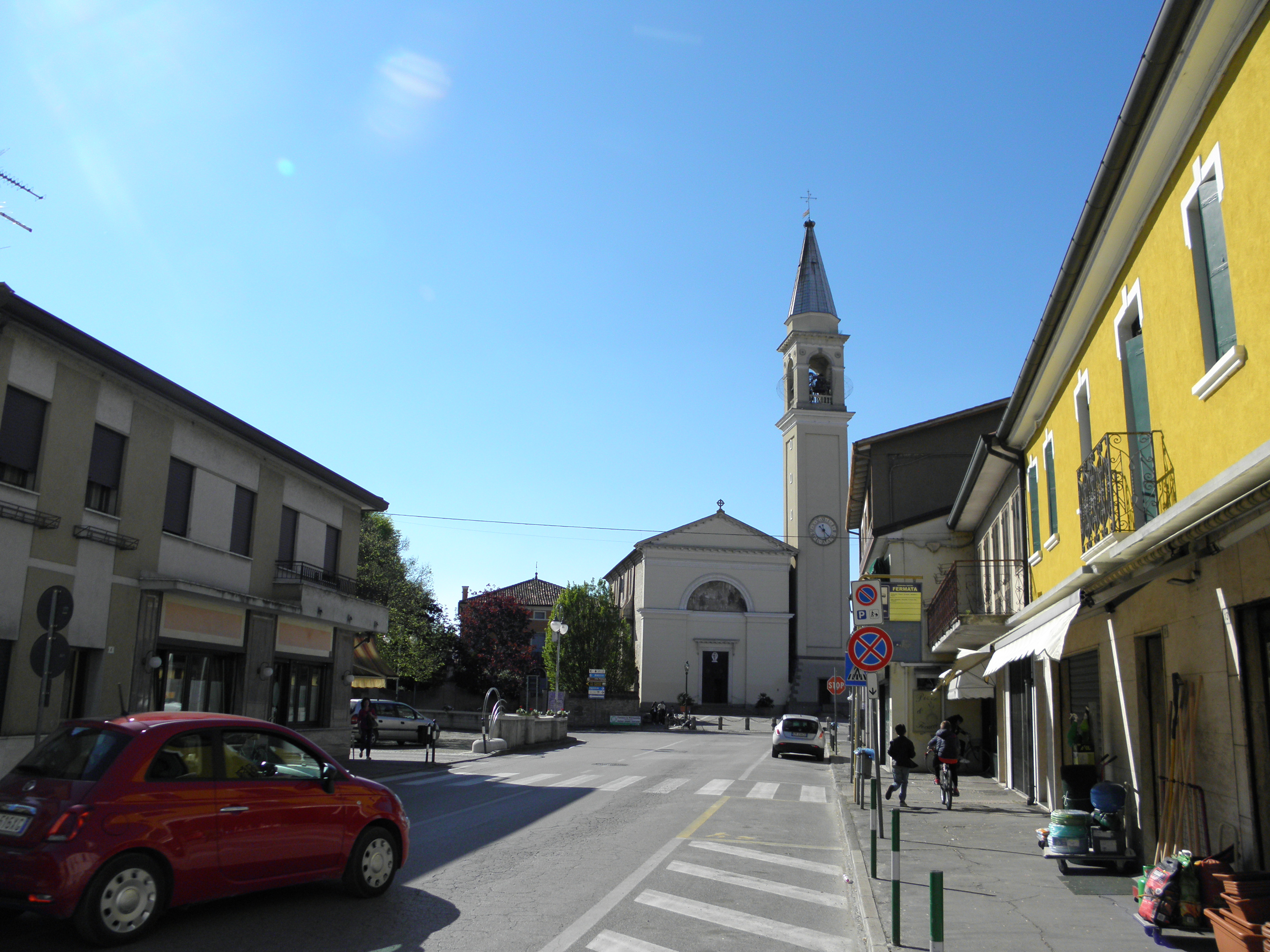

- Location within Italy Location within Veneto
- Coordinates: 45°16′N 11°47′E
- Country: Italy
- Region: Veneto
- Province: Padua (PD)

Area
  - Total: 13.2 km^{2} (5.1 sq mi)
- Elevation: 9 m (30 ft)

Population (Dec. 2004)
  - Total: 3,756
  - Density: 285/km^{2} (737/sq mi)
- Time zone: UTC+1 (CET)
  - Summer (DST): UTC+2 (CEST)
- Postal code: 35020
- Dialing code: 0429

Pernumia is a comune (municipality) in the Province of Padua in the Italian region Veneto, located about 45 kilometres (28 mi) southwest of Venice and about 20 kilometres (12 mi) southwest of Padua. As of 31 December 2004, it had a population of 3,756 and an area of 13.2 square kilometres (5.1 mi^{2}).

Pernumia borders the following municipalities: Battaglia Terme, Cartura, Due Carrare, Monselice, San Pietro Viminario.

== Demographic evolution ==
Historical population

Year	Pop.	±%
1861	?	—
1871	2,536	—
1881	2,719	+7.2%
1901	2,948	+8.4%
1911	3,353	+13.7%

Year	Pop.	±%
1921	3,692	+10.1%
1931	3,947	+6.9%
1936	4,077	+3.3%
1951	4,230	+3.8%
1961	3,468	−18.0%

Year	Pop.	±%
1971	3,305	−4.7%
1981	3,436	+4.0%
1991	3,634	+5.8%
2001	3,717	+2.3%

Source: Data from ISTAT
