= Agna =

- Comune
- Comune di Agna
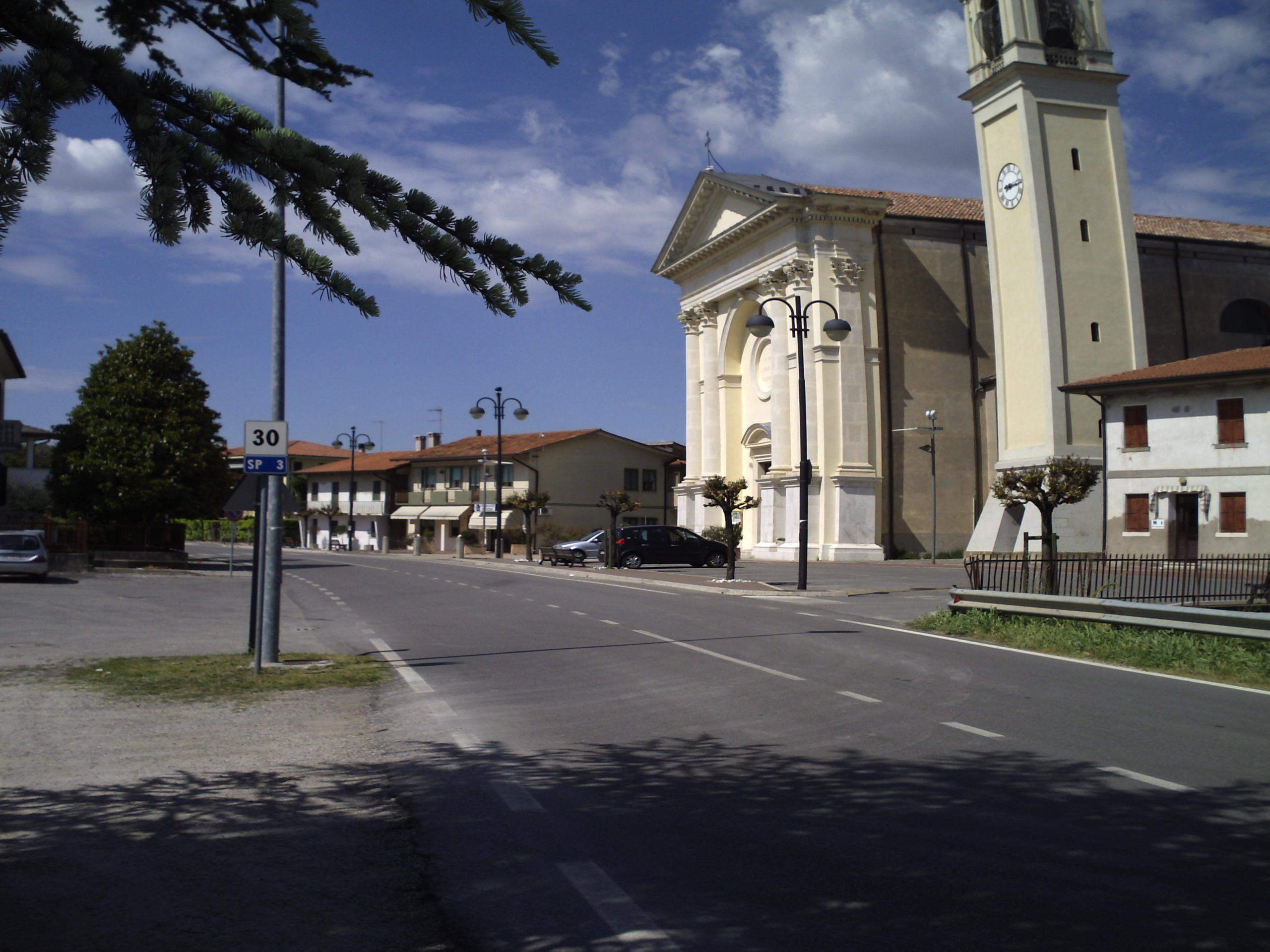

- Location within Italy Location within Veneto
- Coordinates: 45°10′N 11°58′E
- Country: Italy
- Region: Veneto
- Province: Padua (PD)
- Frazioni: Anguillara Veneta, Arre, Bagnoli di Sopra, Candiana, Cavarzere (VE), Cona (VE), Correzzola (PD)

Area
  - Total: 18 km^{2} (6.9 sq mi)
- Elevation: 5 m (16 ft)

Population (28 February 2007)
  - Total: 3,288
  - Density: 180/km^{2} (470/sq mi)
- Demonym: agnensi
- Time zone: UTC+1 (CET)
  - Summer (DST): UTC+2 (CEST)
- Postal code: 35021
- Dialing code: 049
- ISTAT code: 028002
- Saint day: 10 August
- Website: Official website

Agna is a town and commune in the province of Padua, in the Veneto region of northern Italy.
