= Bovolenta =

- Comune
- Comune di Bovolenta
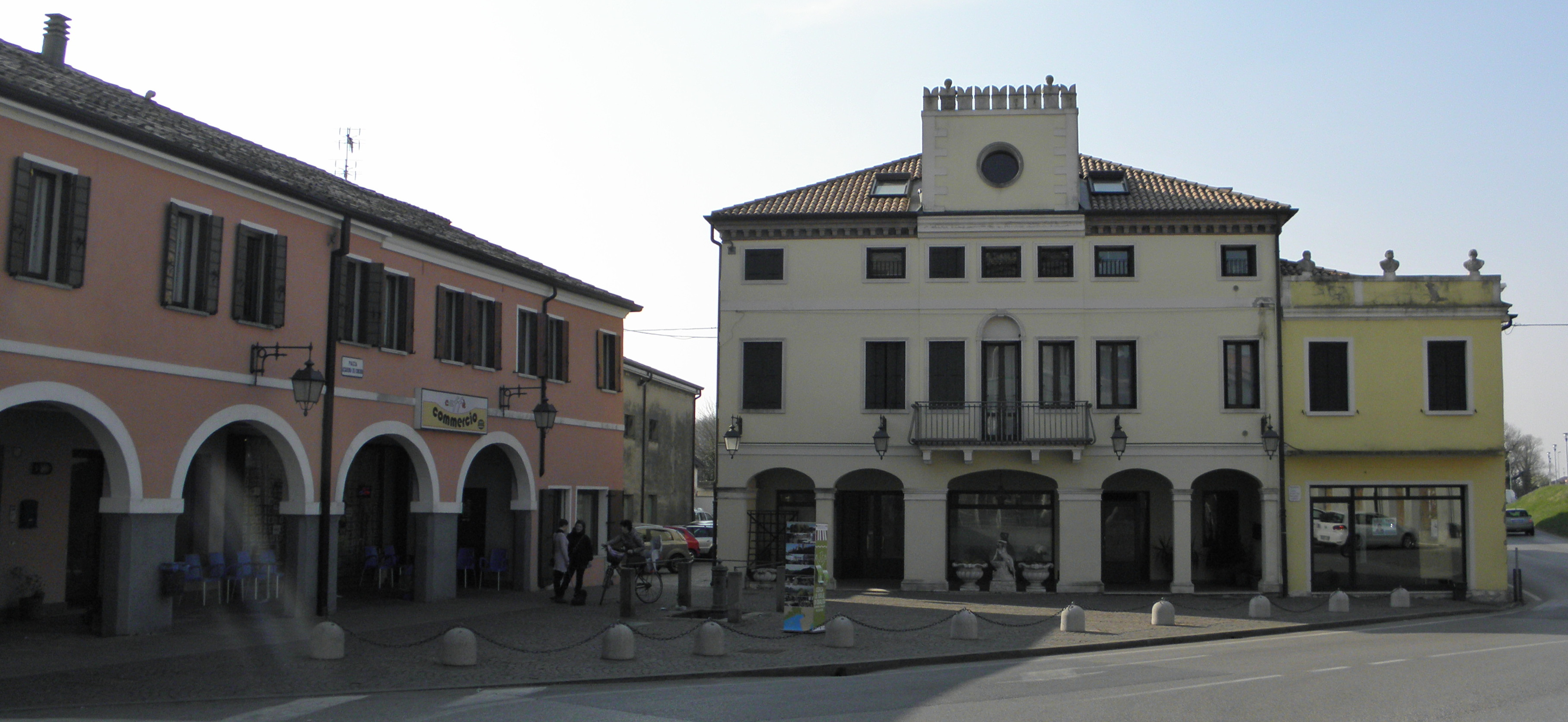

- Location within Italy Location within Veneto
- Coordinates: 45°16′N 11°56′E
- Country: Italy
- Region: Veneto
- Province: Province of Padua (PD)

Area
  - Total: 22.7 km^{2} (8.8 sq mi)

Population (Dec. 2004)
  - Total: 3,127
  - Density: 138/km^{2} (357/sq mi)
- Time zone: UTC+1 (CET)
  - Summer (DST): UTC+2 (CEST)
- Postal code: 35024
- Dialing code: 049
- Website: Official website

Bovolenta is a comune (municipality) in the Province of Padua in the Italian region Veneto, located about 35 kilometres (22 mi) southwest of Venice and about 15 kilometres (9 mi) southeast of Padua. As of 31 December 2004, it had a population of 3,127 and an area of 22.7 square kilometres (8.8 mi^{2}).

Bovolenta borders the following municipalities: Brugine, Candiana, Cartura, Casalserugo, Polverara, Pontelongo, Terrassa Padovana.

== Demographic evolution ==
Historical population

Year	Pop.	±%
1861	?	—
1871	3,088	—
1881	3,129	+1.3%
1901	3,150	+0.7%
1911	3,721	+18.1%

Year	Pop.	±%
1921	4,068	+9.3%
1931	4,229	+4.0%
1936	4,330	+2.4%
1951	4,258	−1.7%
1961	3,394	−20.3%

Year	Pop.	±%
1971	2,965	−12.6%
1981	3,064	+3.3%
1991	3,088	+0.8%
2001	3,144	+1.8%

Source: Data from ISTAT
