= Polverara =

- Comune
- Comune di Polverara
- Location within Italy Location within Veneto
- Coordinates: 45°19′N 11°58′E
- Country: Italy
- Region: Veneto
- Province: Province of Padua (PD)
- Frazioni: Isola dell'Abbà

Area
  - Total: 9.8 km^{2} (3.8 sq mi)
- Elevation: 6 m (20 ft)

Population (Dec. 2004)
  - Total: 2,555
  - Density: 260/km^{2} (680/sq mi)
- Time zone: UTC+1 (CET)
  - Summer (DST): UTC+2 (CEST)
- Postal code: 35020
- Dialing code: 049

Polverara is a comune (municipality) in the Province of Padua in the Italian region Veneto, located about 30 kilometres (19 mi) southwest of Venice and about 14 kilometres (9 mi) southeast of Padua. As of 31 December 2004, it had a population of 2,555 and an area of 9.8 square kilometres (3.8 mi^{2}).

The municipality of Polverara contains the frazione (subdivision) Isola dell'Abbà.

Polverara borders the following municipalities: Bovolenta, Brugine, Casalserugo, Legnaro, Ponte San Nicolò.

== Demographic evolution ==
Historical population

Year	Pop.	±%
1861	?	—
1871	1,615	—
1881	1,731	+7.2%
1901	1,891	+9.2%
1911	2,119	+12.1%

Year	Pop.	±%
1921	2,444	+15.3%
1931	2,584	+5.7%
1936	2,752	+6.5%
1951	2,502	−9.1%
1961	2,113	−15.5%

Year	Pop.	±%
1971	2,091	−1.0%
1981	2,283	+9.2%
1991	2,271	−0.5%
2001	2,345	+3.3%

Source: Data from ISTAT

== Twin towns ==
Polverara is twinned with:

- Jimena, Spain
