= Casalserugo =

- Comune
- Comune di Casalserugo
- Location within Italy Location within Veneto
- Coordinates: 45°19′N 11°55′E
- Country: Italy
- Region: Veneto
- Province: Province of Padua (PD)

Area
  - Total: 15.5 km^{2} (6.0 sq mi)
- Elevation: 8 m (26 ft)

Population (Dec. 2004)
  - Total: 5,525
  - Density: 356/km^{2} (923/sq mi)
- Demonym: Casalesi
- Time zone: UTC+1 (CET)
  - Summer (DST): UTC+2 (CEST)
- Postal code: 35020
- Dialing code: 049
- Website: Official website

Casalserugo is a comune (municipality) in the Province of Padua in the Italian region Veneto, located about 35 kilometres (22 mi) southwest of Venice and about 12 kilometres (7 mi) southeast of Padua. As of 31 December 2004, it had a population of 5,525 and an area of 15.5 square kilometres (6.0 mi^{2}).

Casalserugo borders the following municipalities: Albignasego, Bovolenta, Cartura, Maserà di Padova, Polverara, Ponte San Nicolò.

== Demographic evolution ==
Historical population

Year	Pop.	±%
1861	?	—
1871	1,829	—
1881	2,006	+9.7%
1901	2,255	+12.4%
1911	2,693	+19.4%

Year	Pop.	±%
1921	3,001	+11.4%
1931	3,293	+9.7%
1936	3,484	+5.8%
1951	3,581	+2.8%
1961	3,310	−7.6%

Year	Pop.	±%
1971	3,913	+18.2%
1981	4,627	+18.2%
1991	4,899	+5.9%
2001	5,519	+12.7%

Source: Data from ISTAT

== Twin towns ==
Casalserugo is twinned with:

- Pola de Siero, Spain, since 2010
