= Terrassa Padovana =

- Comune
- Comune di Terrassa Padovana
- Location within Italy Location within Veneto
- Coordinates: 45°15′N 11°54′E
- Country: Italy
- Region: Veneto
- Province: Province of Padua (PD)

Area
  - Total: 14.7 km^{2} (5.7 sq mi)
- Elevation: 6 m (20 ft)

Population (Dec. 2004)
  - Total: 2,321
  - Density: 158/km^{2} (409/sq mi)
- Time zone: UTC+1 (CET)
  - Summer (DST): UTC+2 (CEST)
- Postal code: 35020
- Dialing code: 049

Terrassa Padovana is a comune (municipality) in the Province of Padua in the Italian region Veneto, located about 40 kilometres (25 mi) southwest of Venice and about 20 kilometres (12 mi) south of Padua. As of 31 December 2004, it had a population of 2,321 and an area of 14.7 square kilometres (5.7 mi^{2}).

Terrassa Padovana borders the following municipalities: Arre, Bovolenta, Candiana, Cartura, and Conselve.

== Demographic evolution ==
Historical population

Year	Pop.	±%
1861	?	—
1871	1,571	—
1881	1,592	+1.3%
1901	1,697	+6.6%
1911	2,045	+20.5%

Year	Pop.	±%
1921	2,326	+13.7%
1931	2,689	+15.6%
1936	2,857	+6.2%
1951	2,761	−3.4%
1961	2,146	−22.3%

Year	Pop.	±%
1971	1,898	−11.6%
1981	1,894	−0.2%
1991	2,049	+8.2%
2001	2,128	+3.9%

Source: Data from ISTAT
