= Legnaro =

- Comune
- Comune di Legnaro
- Legnaro within the Province of Padua

- Location within Italy Location within Veneto
- Coordinates: 45°21′N 11°58′E
- Country: Italy
- Region: Veneto
- Province: Padua (PD)
- Frazioni: Casone, Volparo

Area
  - Total: 14.9 km^{2} (5.8 sq mi)

Population (Dec. 2010)
  - Total: 8,594
  - Density: 577/km^{2} (1,490/sq mi)
- Demonym: Legnaresi
- Time zone: UTC+1 (CET)
  - Summer (DST): UTC+2 (CEST)
- Postal code: 35020
- Dialing code: 049
- Website: Official website

Legnaro is a comune in the Province of Padua in the Italian region Veneto, located about 30 kilometres (19 mi) southwest of Venice and about 11 kilometres (7 mi) southeast of Padua. As of 31 December 2010, it had a population of 8,594 and an area of 14.89 square kilometres (5.75 mi^{2}).

== Information ==
The name of the town comes from the Latin word lignarium (wood), because in the past this area was covered by vast woodlands. The most important monuments of the town are the Church of Saint Biagio (built from 1779 to 1786), Villa Baretta, and Corte Benedettina. The town is also home to the Laboratori Nazionali di Legnaro, a laboratory of the Istituto Nazionale di Fisica Nucleare (National Institute of Nuclear Physics), the Zooprofilattico Experimental Institute, and Padua University Departments of Agriculture and Veterinary Medicine. The patron saint of Legnaro is St. Biagio, and his festival is celebrated every 3 February. Other important festivals are the town fair, which takes place in September and lasts two weeks, and the Horse Festival, which takes places in June and lasts ten days. For this event, riding competitions are organized. The horse is the symbol of the town and at the Horse Festival, visitors can enjoy traditional food, including traditional dishes made of horse meat, such as sfilacci di cavallo and spezzatino di cavallo. In wartime horse meat was an important source of food for the inhabitants of Legnaro and it is said to have saved many people's lives.

== Geography ==
The municipality of Legnaro contains the following frazioni: Casone and Volparo.

Legnaro borders the following municipalities: Brugine, Padua, Polverara, Ponte San Nicolò, Sant'Angelo di Piove di Sacco, Saonara.

== Demographics ==
Historical population

| Year | Pop. | ±% |
|---|---|---|
| 1861 | ? | — |
| 1871 | 3,405 | — |
| 1881 | 3,630 | +6.6% |
| 1901 | 4,272 | +17.7% |
| 1911 | 4,909 | +14.9% |

| Year | Pop. | ±% |
|---|---|---|
| 1921 | 5,386 | +9.7% |
| 1931 | 5,819 | +8.0% |
| 1936 | 5,950 | +2.3% |
| 1951 | 5,498 | −7.6% |
| 1961 | 5,066 | −7.9% |

| Year | Pop. | ±% |
|---|---|---|
| 1971 | 5,539 | +9.3% |
| 1981 | 6,331 | +14.3% |
| 1991 | 6,567 | +3.7% |
| 2001 | 6,895 | +5.0% |

Source: Data from ISTAT
