= Boara Pisani =

- Comune
- Comune di Boara Pisani
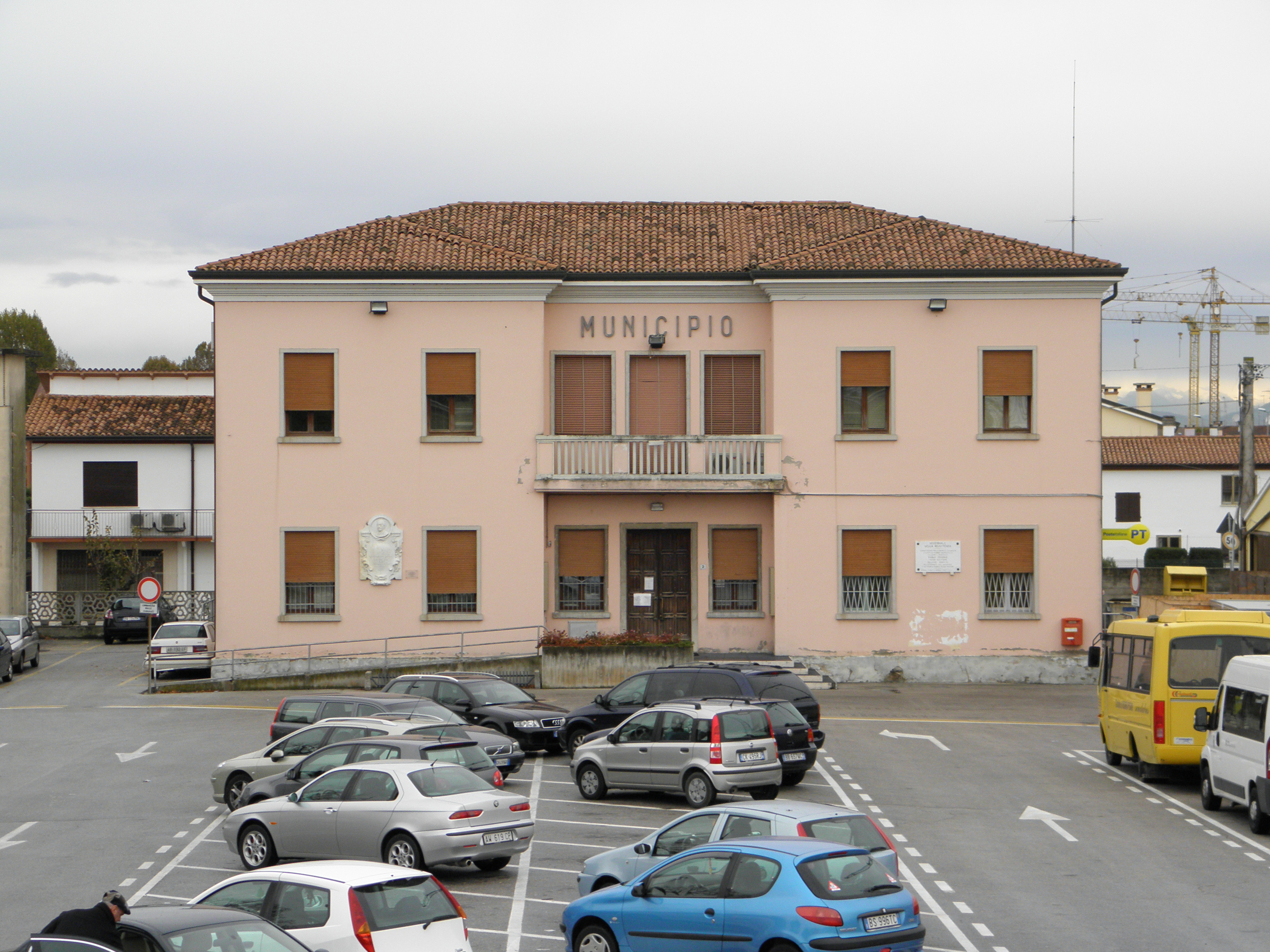
- Town hall

- Location within Italy Location within Veneto
- Coordinates: 45°6′N 11°47′E
- Country: Italy
- Region: Veneto
- Province: Province of Padua (PD)

Area
  - Total: 16.5 km^{2} (6.4 sq mi)

Population (Dec. 2004)
  - Total: 2,542
  - Density: 154/km^{2} (399/sq mi)
- Time zone: UTC+1 (CET)
  - Summer (DST): UTC+2 (CEST)
- Postal code: 35040
- Dialing code: 0425

Boara Pisani is a comune (municipality) in the Province of Padua in the Italian region Veneto, located about 60 kilometres (37 mi) southwest of Venice and about 35 kilometres (22 mi) south of Padua. As of 31 December 2004, it had a population of 2,542 and an area of 16.5 square kilometres (6.4 mi^{2}).

Boara Pisani borders the following municipalities: Anguillara Veneta, Pozzonovo, Rovigo, Stanghella, Vescovana.

== Demographic evolution ==
Historical population

Year	Pop.	±%
1861	?	—
1871	2,509	—
1881	2,490	−0.8%
1901	2,372	−4.7%
1911	2,815	+18.7%

Year	Pop.	±%
1921	3,203	+13.8%
1931	3,578	+11.7%
1936	3,705	+3.5%
1951	3,961	+6.9%
1961	3,004	−24.2%

Year	Pop.	±%
1971	2,699	−10.2%
1981	2,705	+0.2%
1991	2,498	−7.7%
2001	2,507	+0.4%

Source: Data from ISTAT
