= Ponte San Nicolò =

- Comune
- Comune di Ponte San Nicolò
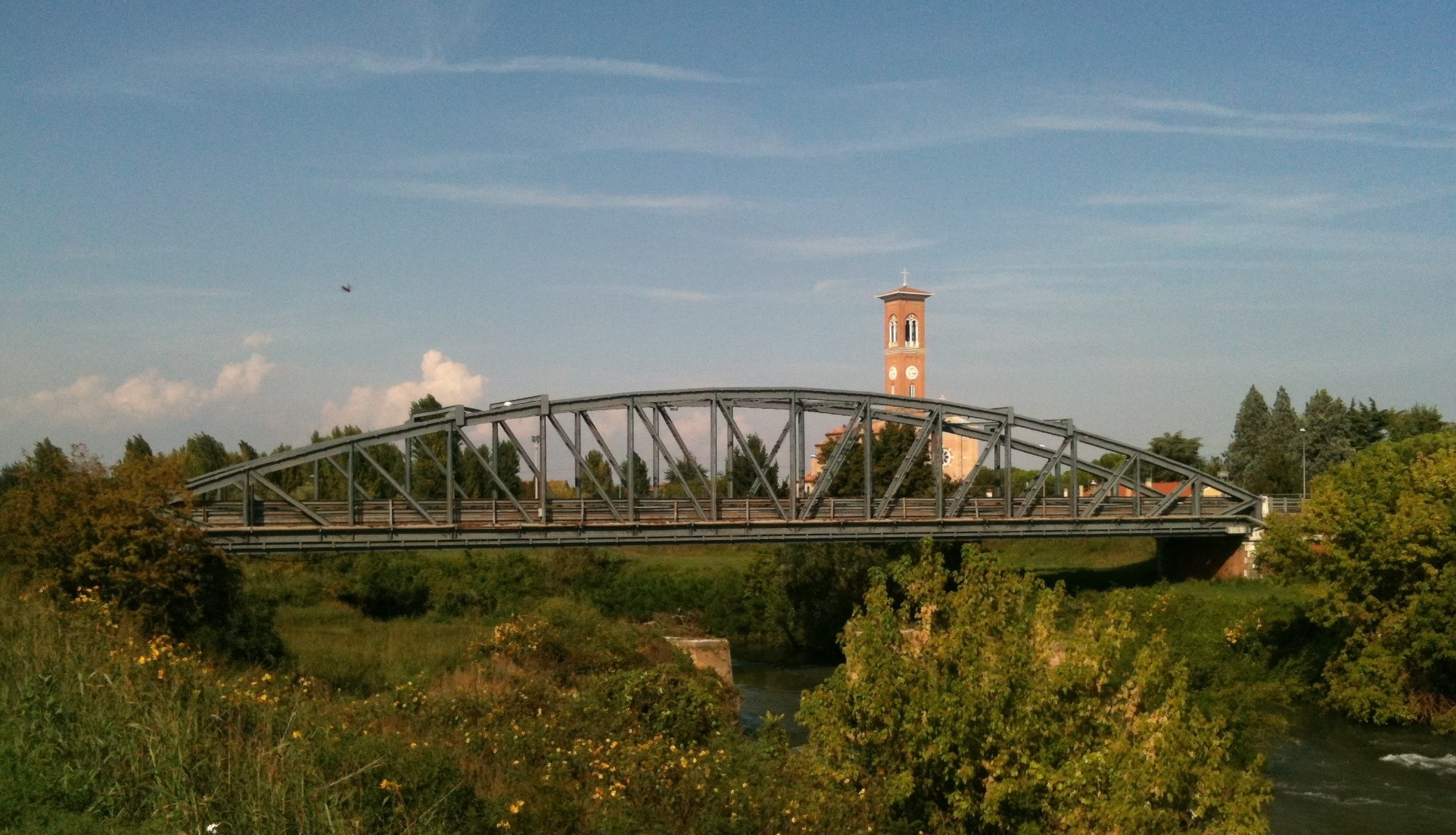

- Location within Italy Location within Veneto
- Coordinates: 45°22′N 11°56′E
- Country: Italy
- Region: Veneto
- Province: Province of Padua (PD)
- Frazioni: Roncaglia, Roncajette, Rio

Area
  - Total: 13.5 km^{2} (5.2 sq mi)

Population (Dec. 2004)
  - Total: 12,656
  - Density: 937/km^{2} (2,430/sq mi)
- Demonym: Sannicolesi
- Time zone: UTC+1 (CET)
  - Summer (DST): UTC+2 (CEST)
- Postal code: 35020
- Dialing code: 049
- Patron saint: Saint Nicolas
- Website: Official website

Ponte San Nicolò is a comune (municipality) in the Province of Padua in the Italian region Veneto, located about 30 kilometres (19 mi) west of Venice and about 8 kilometres (5 mi) southeast of Padua. As of 31 December 2004, it had a population of 12,656 and an area of 13.5 square kilometres (5.2 mi^{2}).

The municipality of Ponte San Nicolò contains the frazioni (subdivisions, mainly villages and hamlets) Roncaglia, Roncajette, and Rio.

Ponte San Nicolò borders the following municipalities: Albignasego, Casalserugo, Legnaro, Padua, Polverara.

The mayor is Martino Schiavon, who was elected on 2019 with a centre-left coalition as his predecessors.

== Demographic evolution ==
Historical population

Year	Pop.	±%
1861	?	—
1871	1,936	—
1881	2,217	+14.5%
1901	2,674	+20.6%
1911	3,306	+23.6%

Year	Pop.	±%
1921	3,801	+15.0%
1931	4,465	+17.5%
1936	4,623	+3.5%
1951	5,077	+9.8%
1961	5,288	+4.2%

Year	Pop.	±%
1971	6,814	+28.9%
1981	8,309	+21.9%
1991	10,589	+27.4%
2001	12,059	+13.9%

Source: Data from ISTAT

== Twin towns ==
Ponte San Nicolò is twinned with:

- Crest, Drôme, France
- Gmina Dobra, Police County, Poland
