= San Pietro Viminario =

- Comune
- Comune di San Pietro Viminario
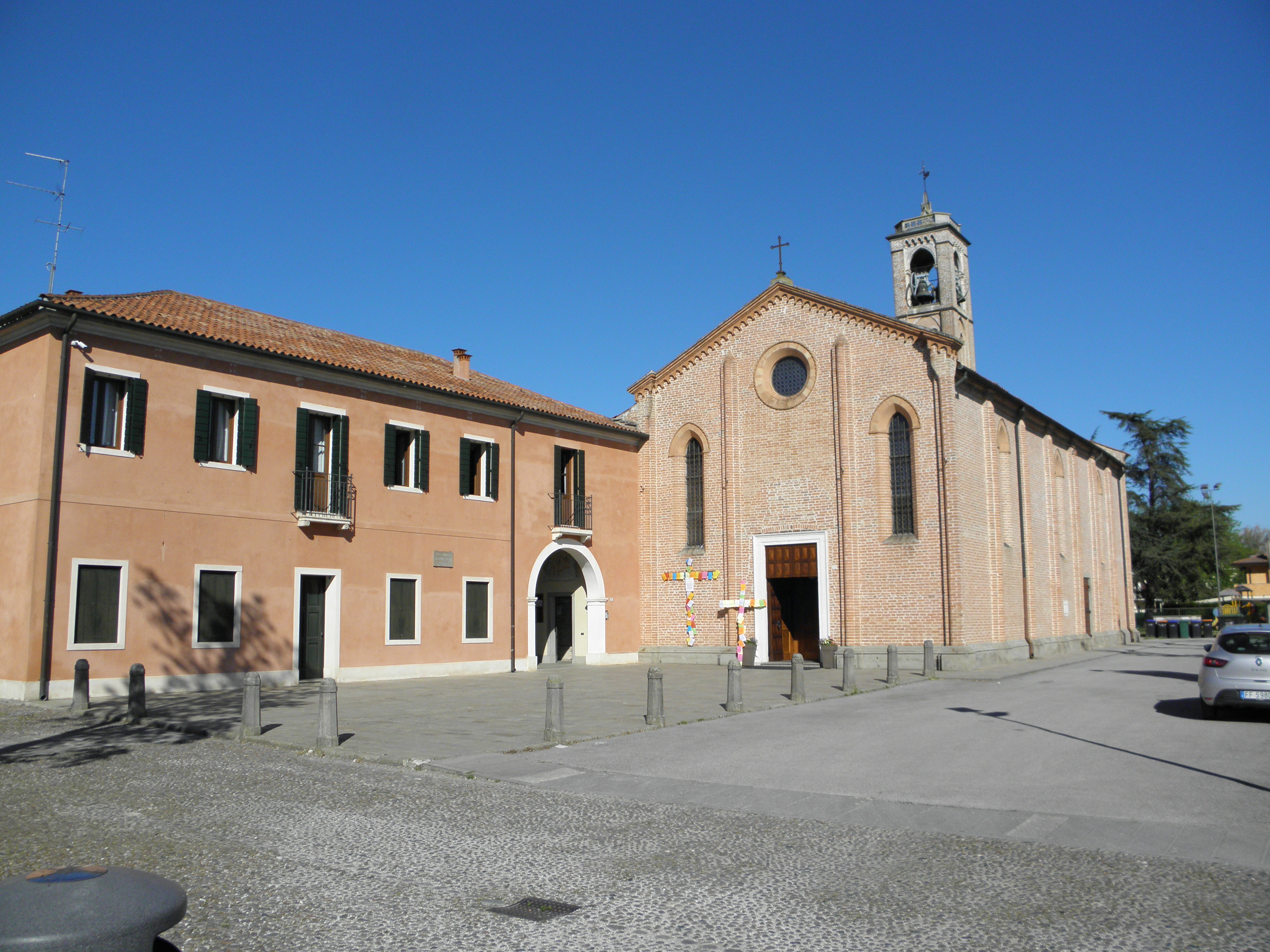

- Location within Italy Location within Veneto
- Coordinates: 45°15′N 11°49′E
- Country: Italy
- Region: Veneto
- Province: Province of Padua (PD)

Area
  - Total: 13.3 km^{2} (5.1 sq mi)

Population (Dec. 2004)
  - Total: 2,680
  - Density: 202/km^{2} (522/sq mi)
- Time zone: UTC+1 (CET)
  - Summer (DST): UTC+2 (CEST)
- Postal code: 35020
- Dialing code: 0429

San Pietro Viminario is a comune (municipality) in the Province of Padua in the Italian region Veneto, located about 45 kilometres (28 mi) southwest of Venice and about 20 kilometres (12 mi) south of Padua. As of 31 December 2004, it had a population of 2,680 and an area of 13.3 square kilometres (5.1 mi^{2}).

San Pietro Viminario borders the following municipalities: Cartura, Conselve, Monselice, Pernumia, Tribano.

== Demographic evolution ==
Historical population

Year	Pop.	±%
1861	?	—
1871	1,604	—
1881	1,800	+12.2%
1901	1,931	+7.3%
1911	2,305	+19.4%

Year	Pop.	±%
1921	2,591	+12.4%
1931	2,816	+8.7%
1936	2,806	−0.4%
1951	2,952	+5.2%
1961	2,347	−20.5%

Year	Pop.	±%
1971	2,220	−5.4%
1981	2,274	+2.4%
1991	2,347	+3.2%
2001	2,481	+5.7%

Source: Data from ISTAT
