= Albignasego =

- Comune
- Comune di Albignasego
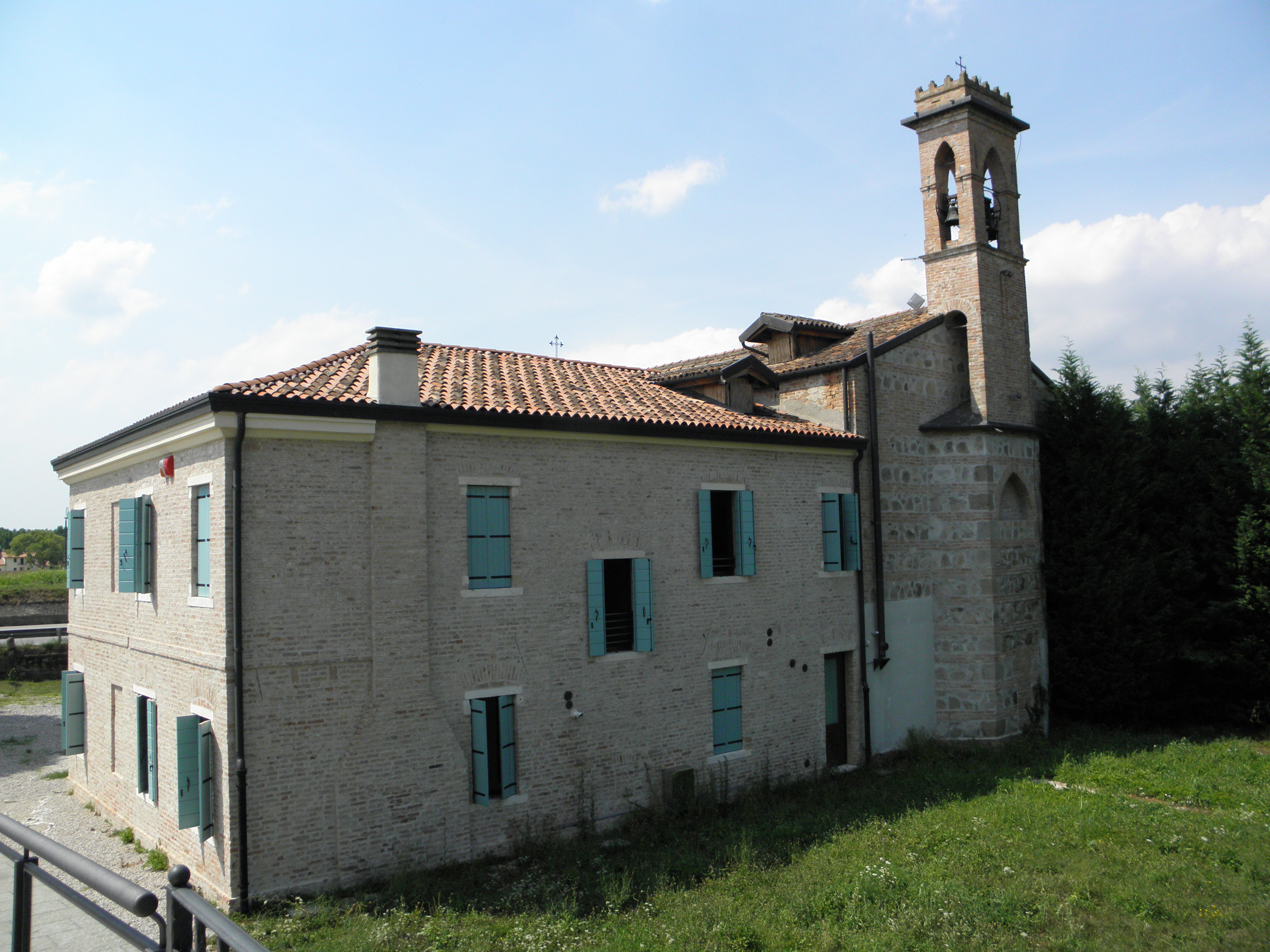

- Coat of arms

- Location of Albignasego in Italy Albignasego (Veneto)
- Coordinates: 45°21′N 11°52′E
- Country: Italy
- Region: Veneto
- Province: Province of Padua (PD)
- Frazioni: Carpanedo, Lion, Mandriola, S. Agostino, S. Giacomo

Government
  - Mayor: Massimiliano Barison (Popolo della Libertà)

Area
  - Total: 20.99 km^{2} (8.10 sq mi)
- Elevation: 11 m (36 ft)

Population (Aug. 2021)
  - Total: 26,006
  - Density: 1,239/km^{2} (3,209/sq mi)
- Demonym: Albignaseghesi
- Time zone: UTC+1 (CET)
  - Summer (DST): UTC+2 (CEST)
- Postal code: 35020
- Dialing code: 049
- Website: Official website

Albignasego is a comune (municipality) in the Province of Padua in the Italian region Veneto, located about 35 kilometres (22 mi) west of Venice and about 7 kilometres (4.3 mi) south of Padua. As of 06/03/2021, it has a population of 26.006 inhabitants and an area of 21.0 square kilometres (8.1 mi^{2}).

The municipality of Albignasego contains the main village and frazioni (hamlets) Carpanedo, Lion, Mandriola, S. Agostino, S. Giacomo.

Albignasego borders the following municipalities: Abano Terme, Maserà di Padova, Casalserugo, Padua, Ponte San Nicolò.

Among the churches in town is San Tommaso Apostolo.

== Demographic evolution ==
Historical population

Year	Pop.	±%
1861	?	—
1871	3,196	—
1881	3,629	+13.5%
1901	4,308	+18.7%
1911	5,287	+22.7%

Year	Pop.	±%
1921	5,912	+11.8%
1931	7,004	+18.5%
1936	7,288	+4.1%
1951	8,035	+10.2%
1961	9,712	+20.9%

Year	Pop.	±%
1971	13,449	+38.5%
1981	15,334	+14.0%
1991	18,070	+17.8%
2001	19,147	+6.0%
2007	20,561	+7.4%

Source: Data from ISTAT

== Twin towns ==
Albignasego is twinned with:

- Galanta, Slovakia, since 2007

== Religion ==
=== Churches ===
- San Tommaso Apostolo
