= Tribano =

Tribano Triban
- Comune
- Comune di Tribano
- Location within Italy Location within Veneto
- Coordinates: 45°13′N 11°50′E
- Country: Italy
- Region: Veneto
- Province: Province of Padua (PD)
- Frazioni: Olmo, San Luca

Area
  - Total: 19.3 km^{2} (7.5 sq mi)

Population (Dec. 2004)
  - Total: 4,284
  - Density: 222/km^{2} (575/sq mi)
- Demonym: Tribanesi
- Time zone: UTC+1 (CET)
  - Summer (DST): UTC+2 (CEST)
- Postal code: 35020
- Dialing code: 049
- Website: Official website

Tribano (Venetian: Triban) is a comune (municipality) in the Province of Padua in the Italian region Veneto, located about 45 kilometres (28 mi) southwest of Venice and about 20 kilometres (12 mi) south of Padua. As of 31 December 2004, it had a population of 4,284 and an area of 19.3 square kilometres (7.5 mi^{2}).

The municipality of Tribano contains the frazioni (subdivisions, mainly villages and hamlets) Olmo and San Luca.

Tribano borders the following municipalities: Anguillara Veneta, Bagnoli di Sopra, Conselve, Monselice, Pozzonovo, San Pietro Viminario.

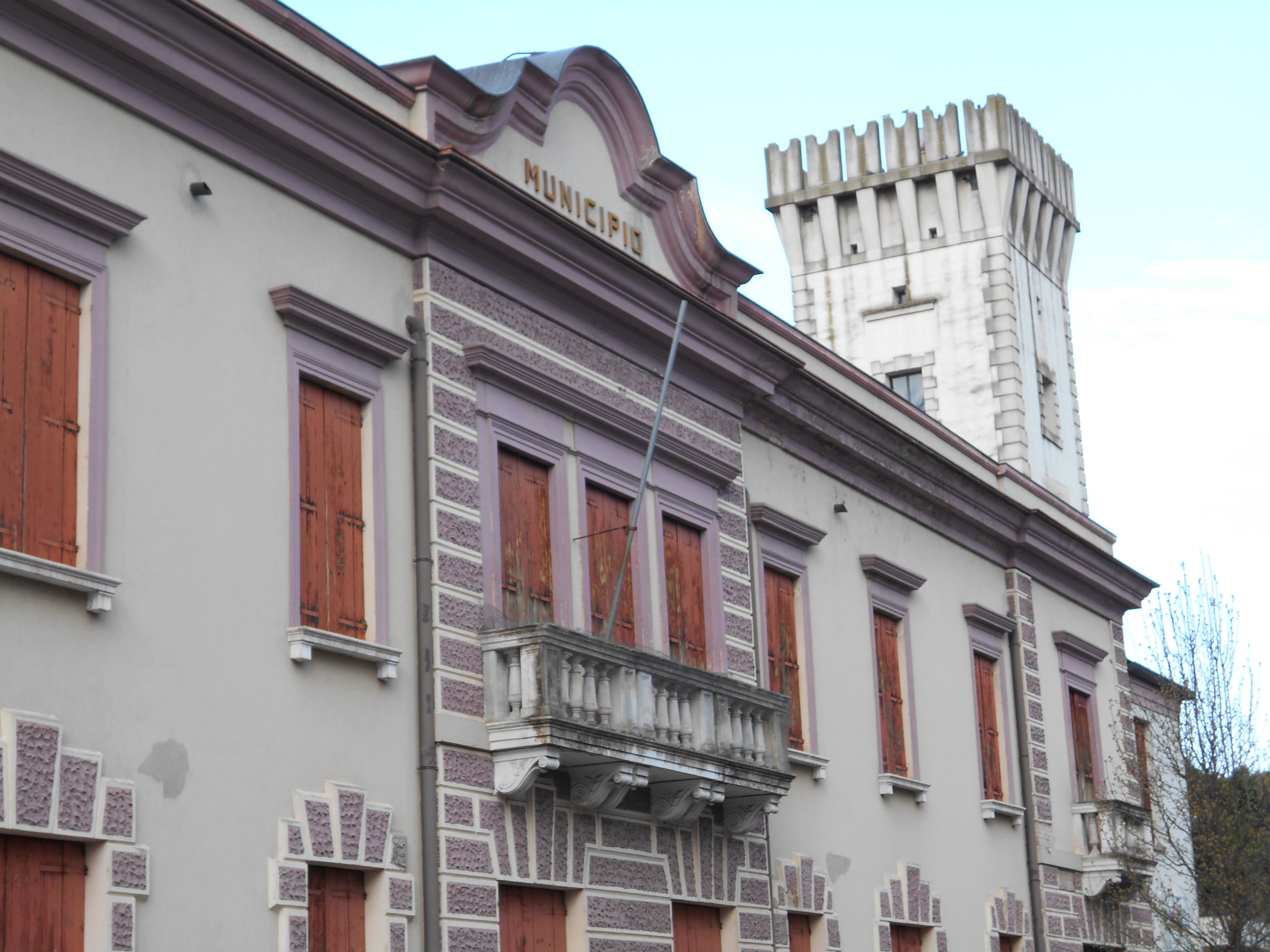
town hall

== Demographic evolution ==
Historical population

Year	Pop.	±%
1861	?	—
1871	3,729	—
1881	3,777	+1.3%
1901	3,986	+5.5%
1911	4,334	+8.7%

Year	Pop.	±%
1921	4,832	+11.5%
1931	5,387	+11.5%
1936	5,795	+7.6%
1951	5,749	−0.8%
1961	4,267	−25.8%

Year	Pop.	±%
1971	3,865	−9.4%
1981	3,901	+0.9%
1991	3,813	−2.3%
2001	3,992	+4.7%

Source: Data from ISTAT
