= Pozzonovo =

- Comune
- Comune di Pozzonovo
- Location within Italy Location within Veneto
- Coordinates: 45°12′N 11°47′E
- Country: Italy
- Region: Veneto
- Province: Province of Padua (PD)

Area
  - Total: 24.5 km^{2} (9.5 sq mi)

Population (Dec. 2004)
  - Total: 3,589
  - Density: 146/km^{2} (379/sq mi)
- Time zone: UTC+1 (CET)
  - Summer (DST): UTC+2 (CEST)
- Postal code: 35020
- Dialing code: 0429

Pozzonovo is a comune (municipality) in the Province of Padua in the Italian region Veneto, located about 50 kilometres (31 mi) southwest of Venice and about 25 kilometres (16 mi) southwest of Padua. As of 31 December 2004, it had a population of 3,589 and an area of 24.5 square kilometres (9.5 mi^{2}).

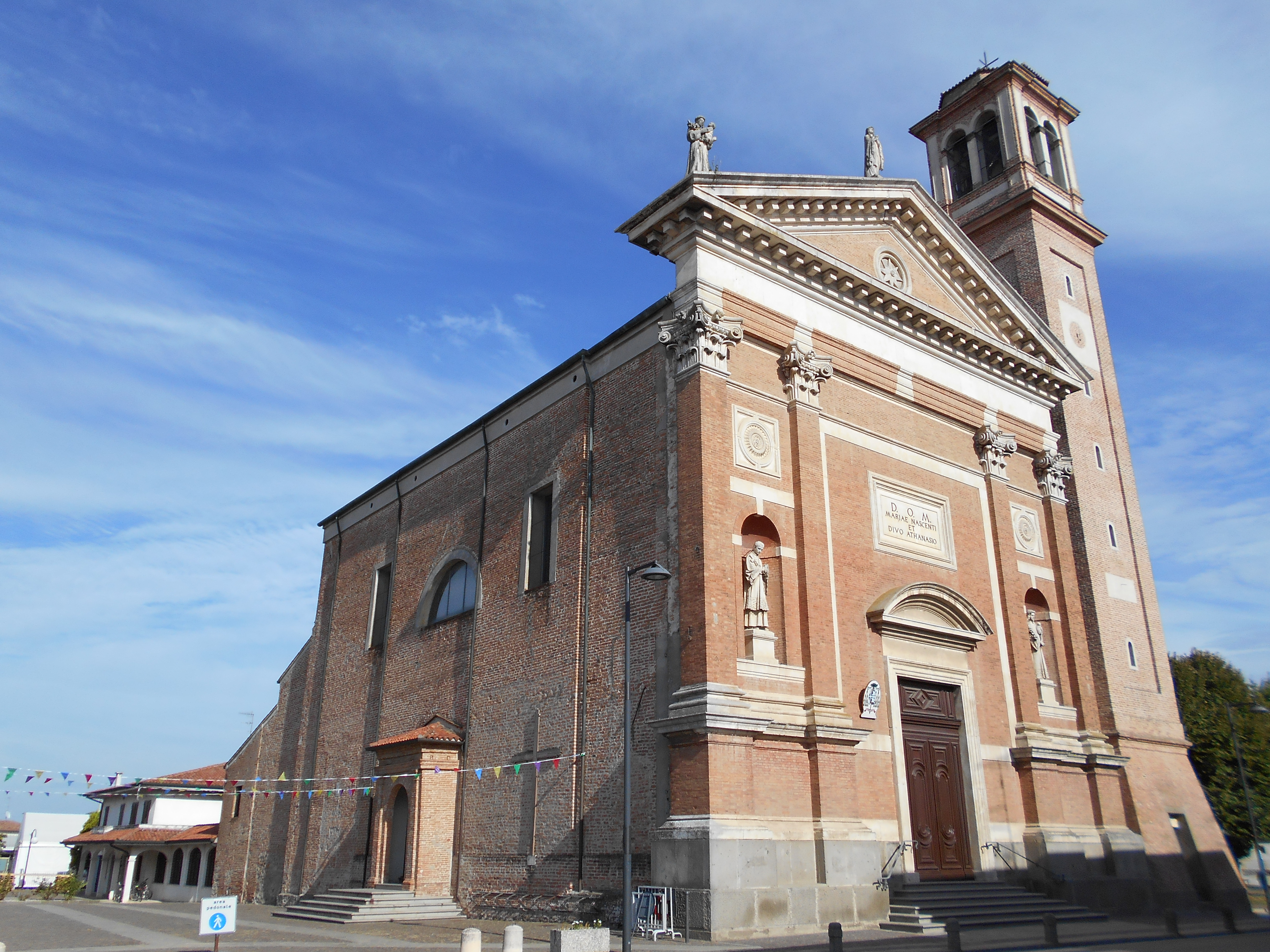
Church, Pozzonovo

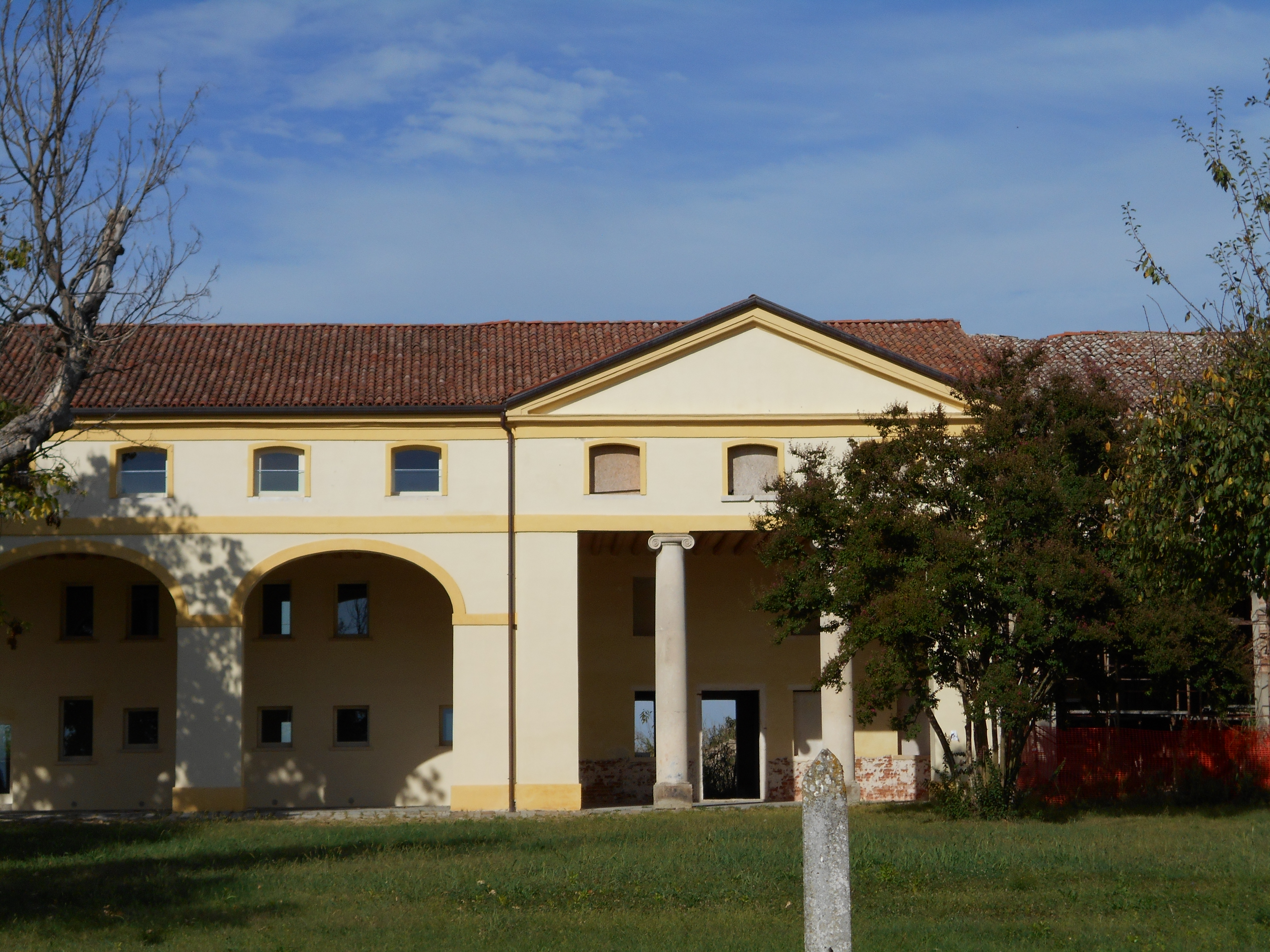
Villa Centanini, Pozzonovo

Pozzonovo borders the following municipalities: Anguillara Veneta, Boara Pisani, Monselice, Solesino, Stanghella, Tribano.

== Demographic evolution ==
Historical population

Year	Pop.	±%
1861	?	—
1871	2,398	—
1881	2,517	+5.0%
1901	2,794	+11.0%
1911	3,243	+16.1%

Year	Pop.	±%
1921	3,679	+13.4%
1931	4,318	+17.4%
1936	4,655	+7.8%
1951	4,739	+1.8%
1961	3,626	−23.5%

Year	Pop.	±%
1971	3,413	−5.9%
1981	3,435	+0.6%
1991	3,523	+2.6%
2001	3,445	−2.2%

Source: Data from ISTAT
