= Conselve =

- Comune
- Comune di Conselve
- Location within Italy Location within Veneto
- Coordinates: 45°14′N 11°52′E
- Country: Italy
- Region: Veneto
- Province: Province of Padua (PD)
- Frazioni: Palù, Beolo

Area
  - Total: 24.2 km^{2} (9.3 sq mi)
- Elevation: 7 m (23 ft)

Population (Dec. 2004)
  - Total: 10,486
  - Density: 433/km^{2} (1,120/sq mi)
- Demonym: Conselvani
- Time zone: UTC+1 (CET)
  - Summer (DST): UTC+2 (CEST)
- Postal code: 35026
- Dialing code: 049
- Website: Official website

Conselve is a comune (municipality) in the Province of Padua in the Italian region Veneto, located about 40 kilometres (25 mi) southwest of Venice and about 20 kilometres (12 mi) south of Padua. It has a population of 10,486 and an area of 24.2 square kilometres (9.3 mi^{2}).

The municipality of Conselve contains the frazione (subdivisions, mainly villages and hamlets) Palù and Beolo.

Conselve borders the following municipalities: Arre, Bagnoli di Sopra, Cartura, San Pietro Viminario, Terrassa Padovana, Tribano.

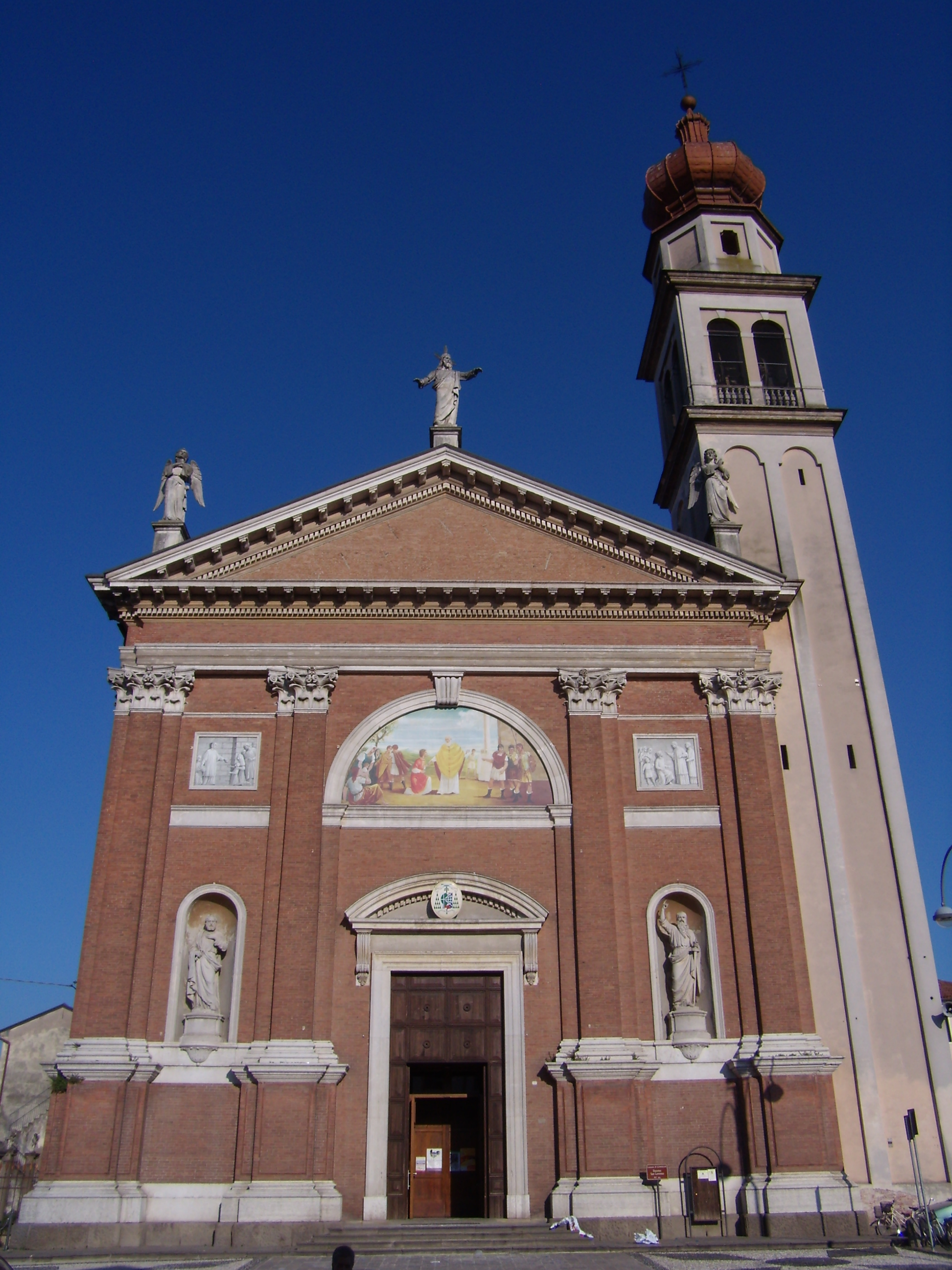
cathedral of San Lorenzo

== Demographic evolution ==
Historical population

Year	Pop.	±%
1861	?	—
1871	4,433	—
1881	4,928	+11.2%
1901	5,358	+8.7%
1911	6,300	+17.6%

Year	Pop.	±%
1921	7,157	+13.6%
1931	7,712	+7.8%
1936	8,113	+5.2%
1951	8,302	+2.3%
1961	6,885	−17.1%

Year	Pop.	±%
1971	7,491	+8.8%
1981	8,217	+9.7%
1991	8,460	+3.0%
2001	8,970	+6.0%

Source: Data from ISTAT

== Twin towns ==
Conselve is twinned with:

- Torcy, Saône-et-Loire, France
- Jászberény, Hungary
