= Bagnoli di Sopra =

Bagnoli di Sopra Bagnołi de Sora
- Comune
- Comune di Bagnoli di Sopra
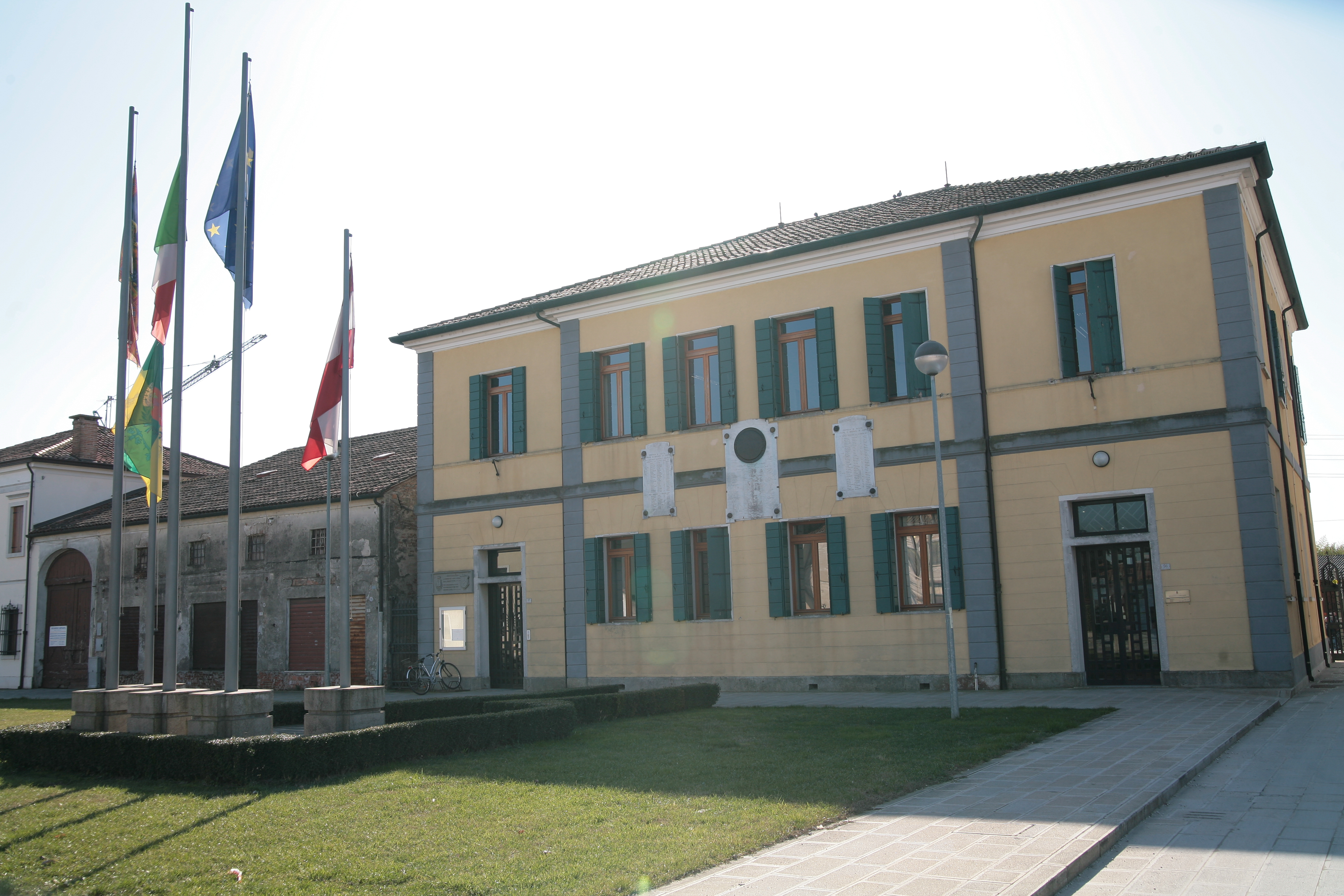

- Location within Italy Location within Veneto
- Coordinates: 45°11′N 11°53′E
- Country: Italy
- Region: Veneto
- Province: Province of Padua (PD)

Area
  - Total: 34.9 km^{2} (13.5 sq mi)

Population (Dec. 2004)
  - Total: 3,837
  - Density: 110/km^{2} (285/sq mi)
- Time zone: UTC+1 (CET)
  - Summer (DST): UTC+2 (CEST)
- Postal code: 35023
- Dialing code: 049

Bagnoli di Sopra (Venetian: Bagnołi de Sora) is a comune (municipality) in the Province of Padua in the Italian region Veneto, located about 45 kilometres (28 mi) southwest of Venice and about 25 kilometres (16 mi) south of Padua. As of 31 December 2004, it had a population of 3,837 and an area of 34.9 square kilometres (13.5 mi^{2}).

Bagnoli di Sopra borders the following municipalities: Agna, Anguillara Veneta, Arre, Conselve, Tribano.

== Demographic evolution ==
Historical population

Year	Pop.	±%
1861	?	—
1871	3,054	—
1881	3,273	+7.2%
1901	3,652	+11.6%
1911	4,199	+15.0%

Year	Pop.	±%
1921	4,705	+12.1%
1931	5,062	+7.6%
1936	5,403	+6.7%
1951	5,933	+9.8%
1961	4,847	−18.3%

Year	Pop.	±%
1971	4,109	−15.2%
1981	4,078	−0.8%
1991	3,884	−4.8%
2001	3,882	−0.1%

Source: Data from ISTAT

== Sport ==
- A.S.D. Bagnoli Calcio 1967

== Twin towns ==
Bagnoli di Sopra is twinned with:

- Hard, Austria, since 1986
