= Arre, Veneto =

Arre
- Comune
- Comune di Arre
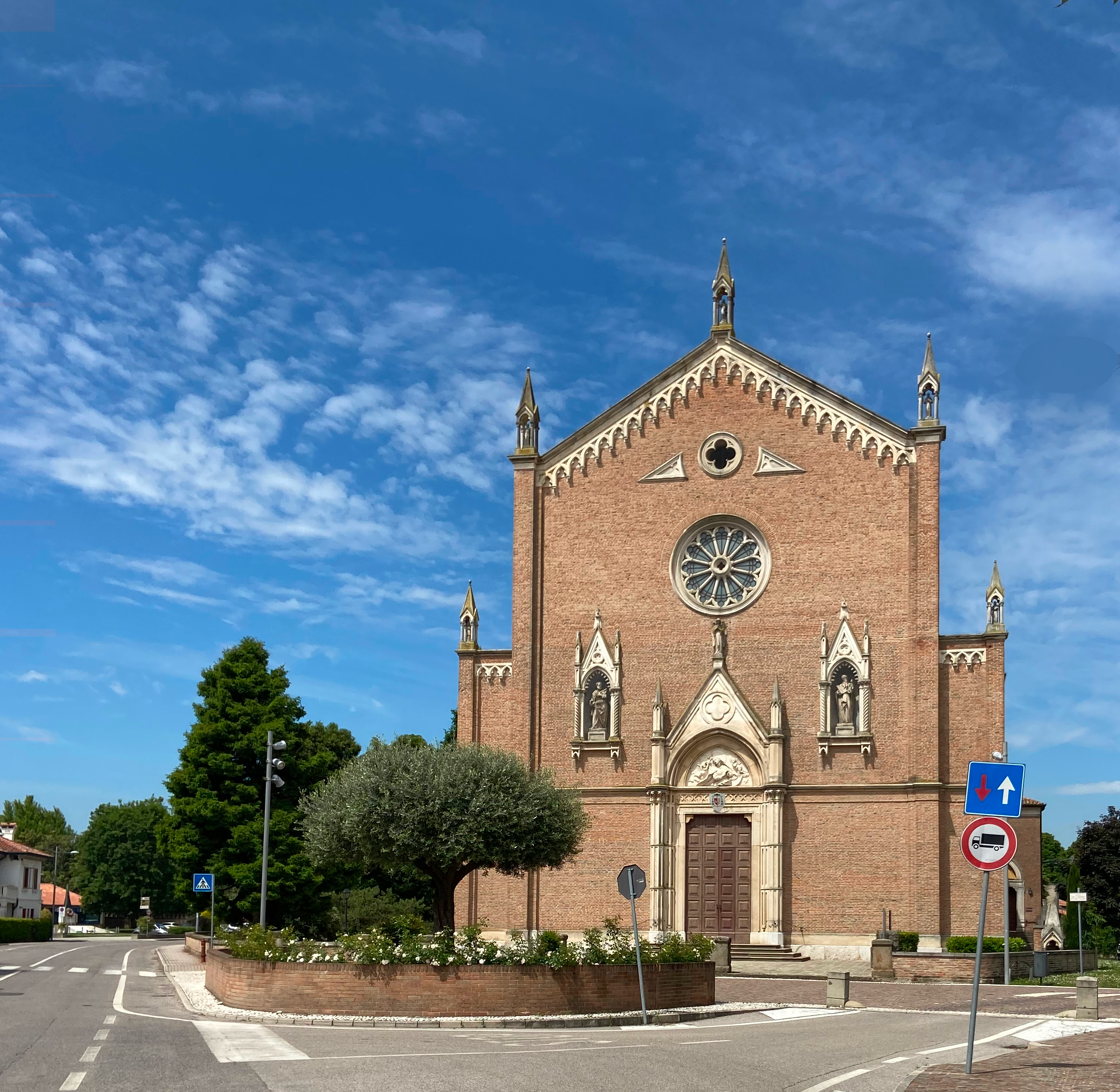

- Location of Arre in Italy Arre (Veneto)
- Coordinates: 45°13′N 11°55′E
- Country: Italy
- Region: Veneto
- Province: Province of Padua (PD)

Area
  - Total: 12.4 km^{2} (4.8 sq mi)

Population (Dec. 2004)
  - Total: 2,067
  - Density: 167/km^{2} (432/sq mi)
- Time zone: UTC+1 (CET)
  - Summer (DST): UTC+2 (CEST)
- Postal code: 35020
- Dialing code: 049

Arre is a comune (municipality) in the Province of Padua in the Italian region Veneto, located about 40 kilometres (25 mi) southwest of Venice and about 25 kilometres (16 mi) south of Padua. As of 31 December 2004, it had a population of 2,067 and an area of 12.4 square kilometres (4.8 mi^{2}).

Arre borders the following municipalities: Agna, Bagnoli di Sopra, Candiana, Conselve, Terrassa Padovana.

== Demographic evolution ==
Historical population

Year	Pop.	±%
1861	?	—
1871	1,621	—
1881	1,747	+7.8%
1901	1,913	+9.5%
1911	2,258	+18.0%

Year	Pop.	±%
1921	2,672	+18.3%
1931	2,954	+10.6%
1936	3,017	+2.1%
1951	2,975	−1.4%
1961	2,275	−23.5%

Year	Pop.	±%
1971	2,006	−11.8%
1981	1,984	−1.1%
1991	1,977	−0.4%
2001	2,029	+2.6%

Source: Data from ISTAT

== Twin towns ==
Arre is twinned with:

- Warmeriville, France
