= Anguillara Veneta =

- Comune
- Comune di Anguillara Veneta
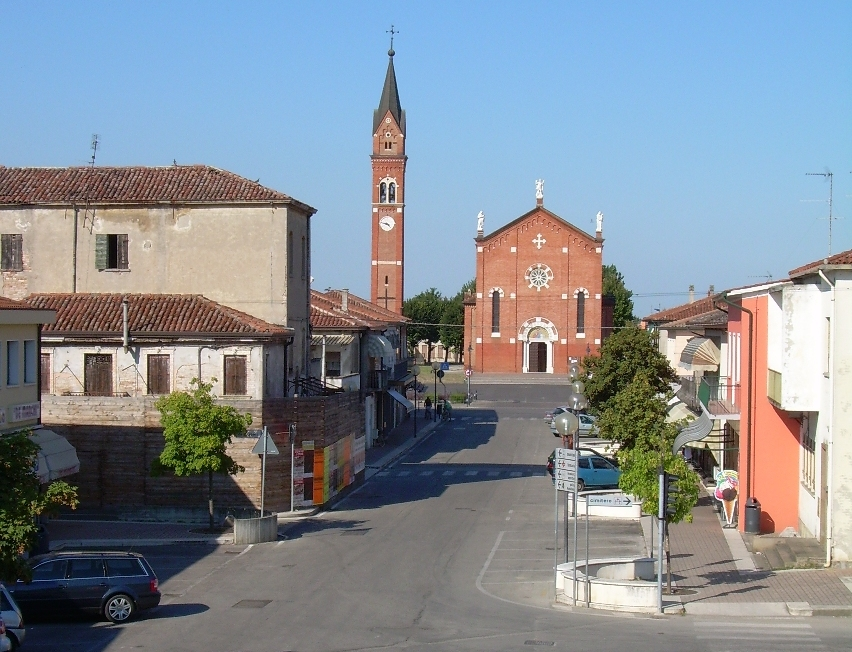

- Coat of arms

- Location of Anguillara Veneta in Italy Anguillara Veneta (Veneto)
- Coordinates: 45°9′N 11°53′E
- Country: Italy
- Region: Veneto
- Province: Padua (PD)
- Frazioni: Borgoforte, Beolo, Ca' Matte, Gobbata, Grottaro, La Marana, Piscina, Pizzoni, Porcari, Rovere, San Giusto, Santa Giustina

Government
  - Mayor: Alessandra Buoso

Area
  - Total: 21.67 km^{2} (8.37 sq mi)
- Elevation: 6 m (20 ft)

Population (1-1-2021)
  - Total: 4,212
  - Density: 194.4/km^{2} (503.4/sq mi)
- Demonym: Anguillarese(i)
- Time zone: UTC+1 (CET)
  - Summer (DST): UTC+2 (CEST)
- Postal code: 35022
- Dialing code: 049
- Patron saint: St. Andrew the Apostle
- Saint day: 30 November
- Website: Official website

Anguillara Veneta is a comune (municipality) in the Province of Padua in the Italian region Veneto, located about 45 kilometres (28 mi) southwest of Venice and about 30 kilometres (19 mi) south of Padua. The city is known for being the town of origin of the Bolsonaro family, a prominent Brazilian political clan.

Brazilian president Jair Bolsonaro was recognized as honorary citizen by the city council of Anguillara Veneta on 25 October 2021. This measure has aroused reactions in Italy.

Anguillara Veneta borders the following municipalities: Agna, Bagnoli di Sopra, Boara Pisani, Cavarzere, Pozzonovo, Rovigo, San Martino di Venezze, Tribano.

The actor José Quaglio (1926–2007) was born in Anguillara Veneta.

== Gallery ==
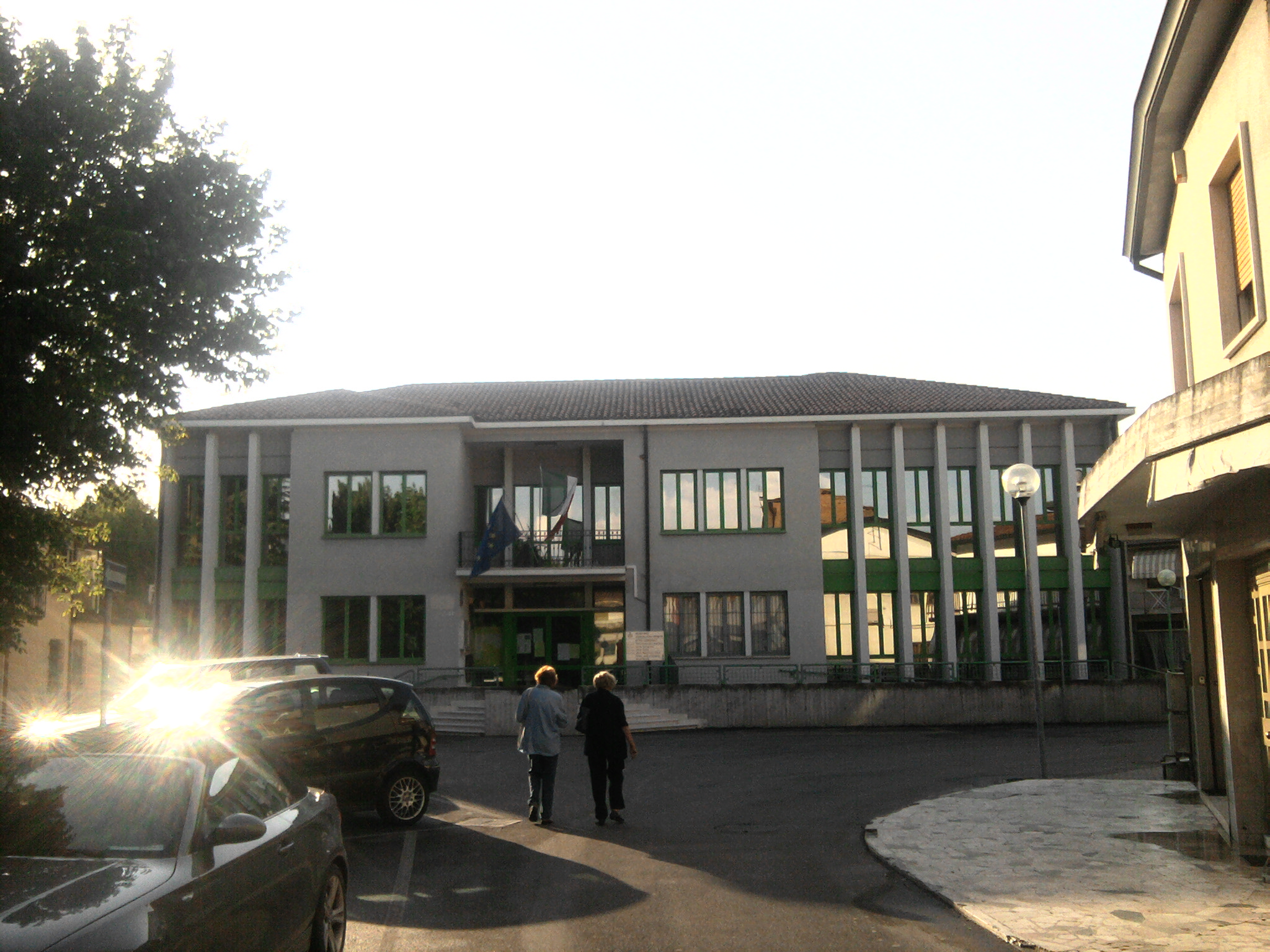
Town house

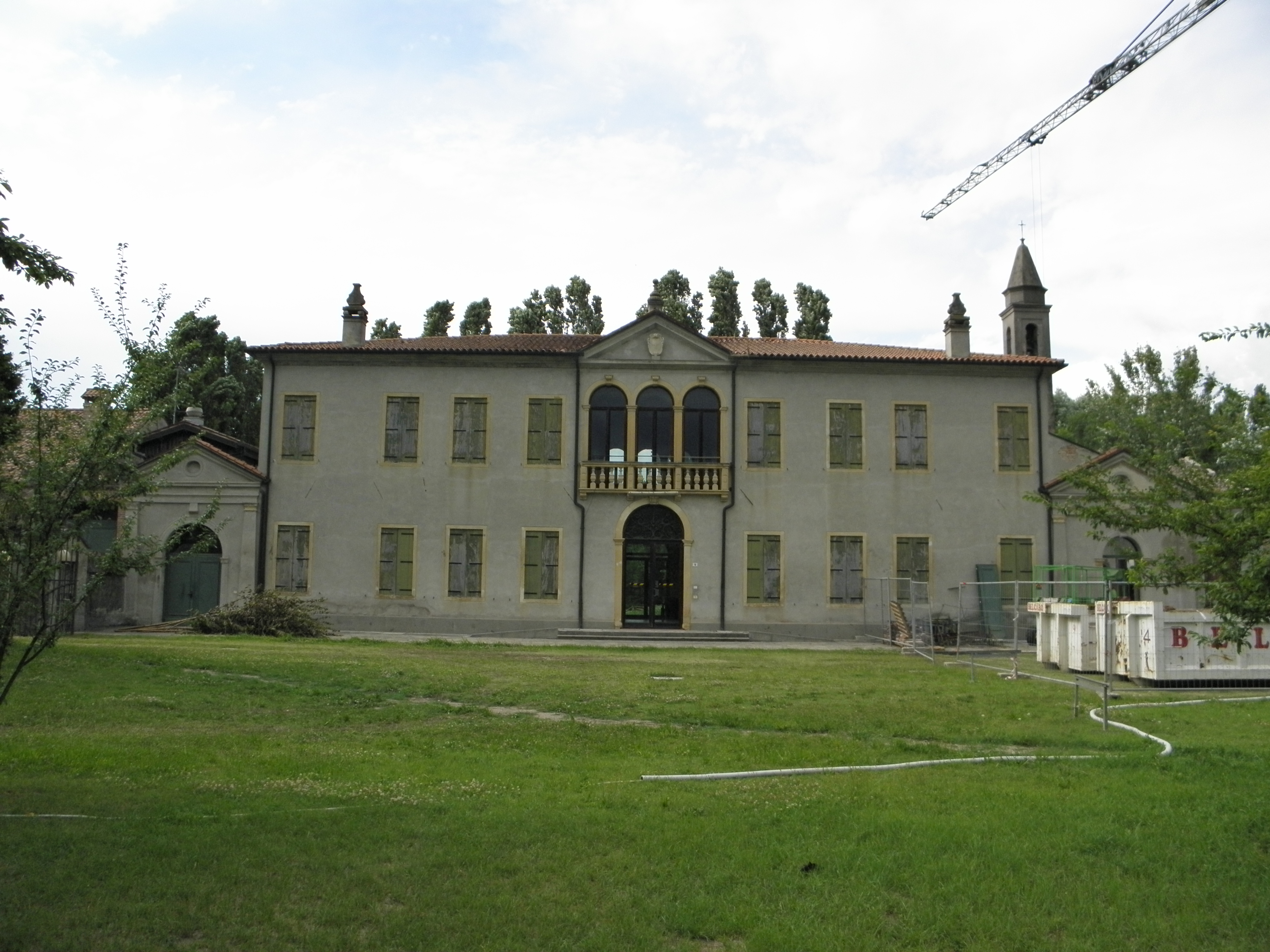
Villa della Veneranda Arca del Santo

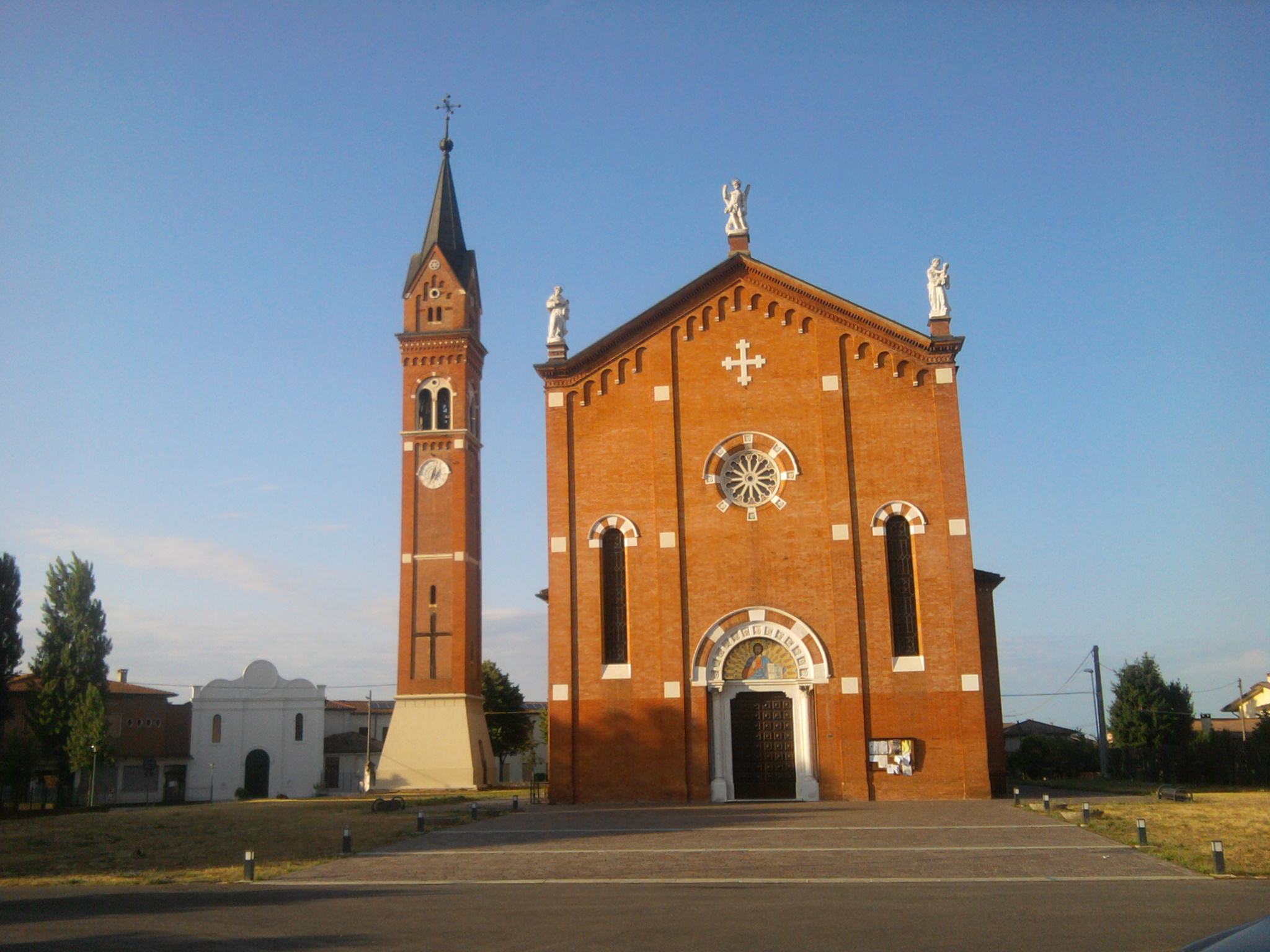
Sant'Andrea apostolo

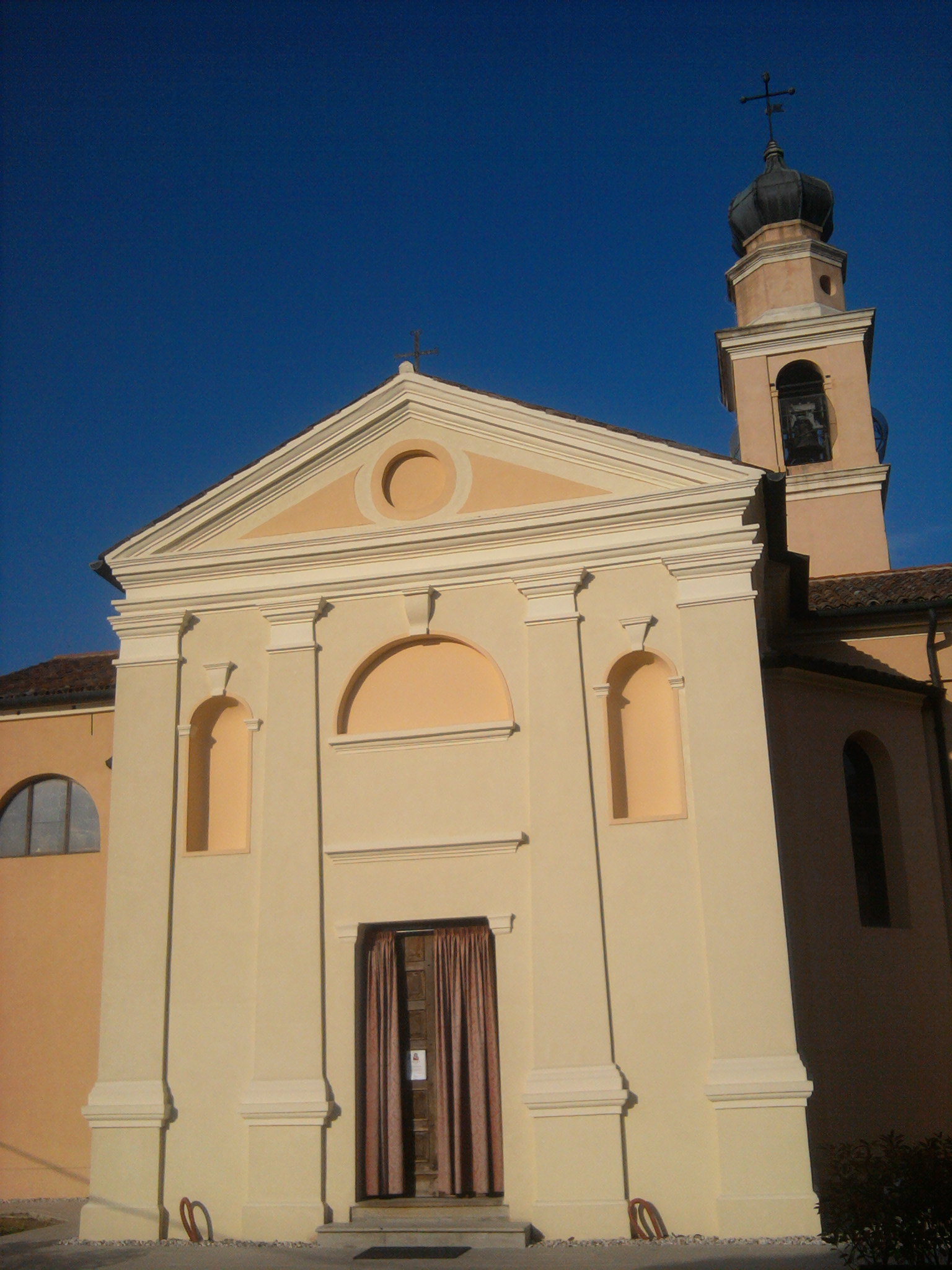
Sant'Antonio Abate
