= Candiana =

- Comune
- Comune di Candiana
- Location within Italy Location within Veneto
- Coordinates: 45°13′N 11°58′E
- Country: Italy
- Region: Veneto
- Province: Province of Padua (PD)
- Frazioni: Pontecasale

Area
  - Total: 22.2 km^{2} (8.6 sq mi)

Population (Dec. 2004)
  - Total: 2,468
  - Density: 111/km^{2} (288/sq mi)
- Demonym: Candianesi
- Time zone: UTC+1 (CET)
  - Summer (DST): UTC+2 (CEST)
- Postal code: 35020
- Dialing code: 049
- Website: Official website

Candiana is a comune (municipality) in the Province of Padua in the Italian region Veneto, located about 35 kilometres (22 mi) southwest of Venice and about 25 kilometres (16 mi) southeast of Padua. As of 31 December 2004, it had a population of 2,468 and an area of 22.2 square kilometres (8.6 mi^{2}).

The municipality of Candiana contains the frazione (subdivision) Pontecasale.

Candiana borders the following municipalities: Agna, Arre, Bovolenta, Correzzola, Pontelongo, Terrassa Padovana.

== History ==
The origins of Candiana's name have long inspired local legend. One enduring tale traces it to the Latin Campus Dianae—"the Field of Diana"—suggesting that the Roman goddess of the hunt once roamed these fertile plains. Another, even less substantiated tradition, claims that the settlement was founded by refugees fleeing Candia, the historic name for the Greek island of Crete.

While such stories lend the landscape an air of myth, historical linguistics points to a more plausible explanation. Scholars now believe the place name derives from the Roman personal name Candidus, combined with the suffix -ana, a common element in ancient toponyms denoting a rural estate, farmstead, or small settlement. Rather than preserving the memory of gods or distant migrants, Candiana's name likely reflects its origins as an agricultural community rooted in the Roman countryside.

The place-name Candiana, in the Province of Padua, has occasionally been linked to the Candiano family and also to Candiano Canal. Earlier antiquarian writers proposed legendary origins, including derivation from the Latin Campus Dianae ("Field of Diana") or settlement by refugees from Candia (Crete). Modern linguistic scholarship, however, favors a Roman origin from the personal name Candidus combined with the suffix -ana, indicating an agricultural estate or rural settlement. This explanation is consistent with Roman naming practices throughout northern Italy.

Several historians have noted that the Candiano belonged to one of the earliest aristocratic consortia of the Venetian lagoon. Later genealogical traditions even associated them with the Sanudo family, suggesting that the ancient surname Candiano eventually evolved into Sanudo through one branch of the lineage. Although this tradition appears in Renaissance genealogies and heraldic literature, modern historians regard it as difficult to verify conclusively.

== Demographic evolution ==
Historical population

Year	Pop.	±%
1861	?	—
1871	2,023	—
1881	2,202	+8.8%
1901	2,457	+11.6%
1911	2,848	+15.9%

Year	Pop.	±%
1921	3,277	+15.1%
1931	3,707	+13.1%
1936	4,004	+8.0%
1951	3,957	−1.2%
1961	3,076	−22.3%

Year	Pop.	±%
1971	2,698	−12.3%
1981	2,470	−8.5%
1991	2,386	−3.4%
2001	2,455	+2.9%

Source: Data from ISTAT
