= Colegio Salesiano de Leon XIII =

School in Bogotá, Cundinamarca, Colombia

Coordinates: 4°35′41″N 74°04′29″W

Leo XIII Salesian College
- Spanish: Colegio Salesiano León XIII
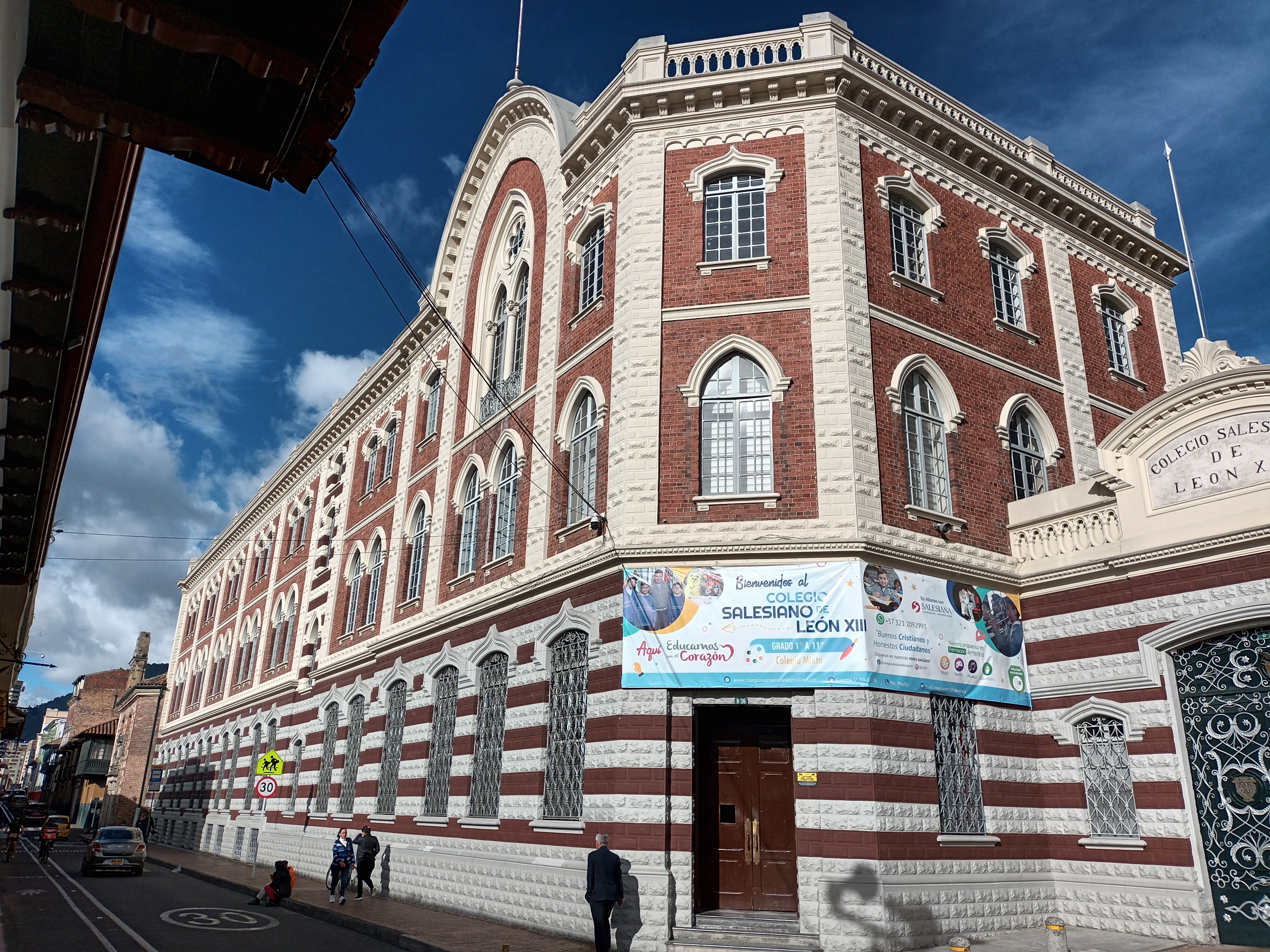
- Colegio Salesiano León XIII
- Bogotá, Cundinamarca; Colombia

Information
- Religious affiliation: Catholicism
- Established: 1 September 1890

The Leo XIII Salesian College is a private male educational institution managed by the Salesian Community in Colombia. It is headquartered in historic center of La Candelaria of Bogotá, Colombia. The school was awarded the Educative Excellence Award, for the private schools category in 2006. In 2010, it celebrated its 120th anniversary. It is the parent of the Salesians in Colombia, provides an excellent education based on the philosophy of San Juan Bosco, is considered one of the best educational institutions of Colombia for work that the school develops, for its high academic performance as shown by the results in sting ICFES performance "Very High". The Department of Education Bogotá, puts the campus as a place of very high level of education in the country, since in his hundred and twenty-year history has developed and demonstrated the process to make children and young people as well (good Christians and honest citizens)

== History ==
The Salesian School of Leo XIII was founded on 1 September 1890, a total of 50 students, and as a matter of boarding. The foundation Salesian had been requested to San Juan Bosco repeatedly since 1882 by the bishop of Cartagena, Monsignor Eugene Biffi, and since 1886 by the Colombian government that presided Dr. Rafael Núñez. Finally, by direct intervention of Pope Leo XIII (which is why the first foundation bearing his name), the successor of Don Bosco, Don Michael Rua, sent the first eight Salesian. They arrived in Bogota the first five, on Tuesday February 11, 1890. Then came the other two. The first rector was the father and higher Evasio Rabagliatti. The others were the father Miguel Unia (pioneer of the apostolate with lepers in Agua de Dios), and the priest Silvestre Rabagliatti. Besides Messrs. Angel Brothers Colombo (Italian carpenter), Carlos Migliotti (Italian tailor) and Felipe Kaczmarzik (shoe polish).

The first few days, the Salesian were guests of parents Jesuits in College of St. Bartholomew (corner of the Plaza de Bolívar). Later they were given a small damp house, at the foot of the current rectory of the parish of Santa Barbara. It was No. 195 which corresponds today to the Carrera 7 No. 5-44. However, the house was totally inadequate for educational purposes. Therefore, the government requested another venue, and on 1 September 1890 the school began in the field of the first courtyard of the old Convent of Carmen, coexisting with the existing military hospital there until 1892.

Although the initial intention was to make a setting for teaching arts like carpentry, shoemaking, the tailoring and blacksmith arts that were then supplemented with notice and type foundry, line in which Salesian were pioneers and listed with honor in the history of graphic arts in Colombia, without However, the year after its founding, was the need to implement classical studies for vocational purposes such as Valdocco in Turin. So it was traditional in these educational institutions division between the two sections of "students" and "artisans".

Following the style of the Salesian houses in Italy, the school functioned as a boarding outset. It was assumed that educational action was safer and complete if the relationship between teachers and students was permanent and continuous. Children only came twice a year to vacation in July and December.

The College of Leo XIII was developed in two sections and at the same time, was the residence of the provincial Superior. This continued until 1957 when, coming to visit the fifth successor of San Juan Bosco in the general direction of the community, Don Renato Ziggiotti, it was decided to separate the technical section and found the Institute Don Bosco Technical Centre. The College of Leo XIII was only like classical school and the following year, 1958, began to accept foreign students who were growing in number until boarding disappeared in 1972.

In 1973, Father Mario Peresson, as director, welcomed the group JuHer (youth, unity and heroism), headed by Camilo alumnus Orbs and he began the evening classes that, the following year (1974), were fully assumed by the school. These evening courses were approved in 1975 by the name of Don Bosco Institute Nocturne and in that same year the school principal, Father Mario Z. Reyes, began the primary section.

Throughout history, the school has been complemented in its different sections, merging them under a single leadership, faithful to the Salesian educational system and always looking not only to expand its coverage, but to do a job too background of Christianity of the students and their families. From 1987 until today, has been implementing a new educational project for greater fidelity to the original Salesian intuitions and a more qualified students and their families. Indeed, we return to technical education through vocational and training courses, as happened in 1988 and today, through the newly established "Technical Training Center Leo XIII", allows us to resume primal intuition train directly to work.

The importance of this school for the Salesian Society of Colombia is that is its parent, and the first institution founded by this community. Previously the space was used by the Discalced Carmelites, that is why there is also located the Teatro Camarín del Carmen and Shrine of Our Lady of Carmen (together administered by the College), the Salesian College of Leo XIII began on September 1, 1890 with the main purpose to strengthen the teaching of arts and labors industrial in Colombia, by request of the president of the time. Technical education was born there that eventually ended with the foundation of the SENA.

Today the Salesian College of Leo XIII has two locations in houses where up to 1,000 students each Basic Education Primary and Secondary School, one of the reasons of Excellence Award was the development of programs such as Associations, is a series of mandatory activities where young chooses a group of interest (in total there are 42 groups) and develops the weekends to supplement their education.

== Social Service ==
Another project is the Social Service, each year the tenth grade students of the college develop community benefit activities in economically disadvantaged institutions associated with the school as a requirement for graduation and service to the Society. This means that the school estudiantes face Colombian reality coexisting with those who suffer most during their school years.

The College includes a night shift to low-income students, in this day and in the primary activity of the groups is called the Oratory but not mandatory.

At headquarters, located in the sector of La Candelaria, is located the administrative center of the college dormitories of the priests of this community, the Santuario del Carmen, the Teatro del Carmen and the dressing room of the school headquarters in charge of secondary education, all these buildings are National Monument. They also work the night shift.

== Primary headquarters ==
In Cundinamarca district headquarters, near the District Administrative Center, is located the Basic Primary day, was part of a Salesian Institute of Technical Education and its building was National Architecture Award for over a century, has a tennis facilities of football and several of volleyball and basketball, along with some rooms that were completely renovated in 2000.
