= Rector Major of the Salesians =

Title of a priest for the Salesians of Don Bosco

- Rectoris Maioris
- Incumbent; Rev. Fr. Fabio Attard, SDB
- Formation: 1874
- First holder: John Bosco

The Rector Major of the Salesians (also known as successor of Don Bosco) is the head of all institutes and superior general of the Salesians of Don Bosco worldwide (over 130 countries and 15000 institutions). It is the title of a Catholic priest that is elected as the general superior of the religious institute Salesians of Don Bosco. He is also considered the successor of Saint John Bosco in the top guidance of his Salesian Order. The first general superior of the order was Don Bosco himself from 1874, the year that the order was officially created and its Salesian Constitutions approved by the Holy See, until his death in 1888. Since then, the Salesians have elected their Superior in the General Chapter for a period of six years. Between 1888 and 2014 there have been ten successors of Don Bosco, seven of them of Italian nationality, one Argentine, one Mexican and one Spaniard. Following the Salesian tradition from their Italian origin, the Rector Major is addressed as Don. The title "Don" is the normal form of address in Italian for a diocesan priest and is the usual term preferred also by Italian priests of a number of religious congregations, including the Salesians. It conveys no suggestion of high rank, but is simply the equivalent of Father as used for priests in many other countries.

According to the Constitutions and Regulations of the Salesians of Don Bosco, the highest superior is the Supreme Pontiff to whom "They welcome his magisterium with docility and help the faithful, especially the young, to accept his teaching" (Art. 125) In the Salesian Constitutions of 1942, the Pope is mentioned as "arbitrator and Supreme Superior" even bound to vow of obedience (Art 49).

Then the Salesians have the Rector Major as the "superior of the Salesian Society" who is the "successor of Don Bosco, the father and center of unity of the Salesian Family" (Art. 126) The functions and responsibilities of the Rector Major are described in the chapter dedicated to the service of authority in the world community of the Salesians.

== Authority ==
The Rector Major is concerned to promote the fidelity of the members of the Salesian Order to the Salesian Charisma (Art. 126) and he has the "ordinary power of government which he exercises according to law over all provinces, houses and members in both spiritual and temporal matters" (Art. 127) In these two functions, the Rector Major is supported by the General Council. These powers are enlisted in the Article 132 of the Salesian Constitutions and they are exercised with the approval of the General Council and accordingly with the Canon Law. Some of the most important are:

- Erecting or closing down a Province or other religious administrative divisions within the Salesian Order.
- Opening or closing down Salesian centers or modify their original purpose.
- Opening new Salesian Novitiates.
- He is the one to call on the General Chapter of the Salesians in Rome.
- Approving the conclusions of Provincial chapters.
- Approving of Provincial rules.
- Appointing of a new councilor in case of disability of one member.
- Appointing the general secretary.
- Appointing of the Procurator, who is the person in charge to deal directly with the Holy See in the name of the Congregation and Postulator General, who is a person in charge of dealing with cases of Saints.
- Election of provincials.

== Election ==
According to the latest rules of the Salesians, the Rector Major is elected from among Salesian priests for a term of single term of six years, not repeatable, by the General Chapter. The Rector Major cannot resign his position without the approval of the Holy See (Art. 128 and 129). At the end of his term of office, the Rector Major convokes a General Chapter to which every Salesian province sends representatives, including its provincial. The General Chapter meets every six months at the Salesian General House (Pissana in Rome), with the purpose to review and update the Salesian charisma and to elect the new Rector Major and his General Council. The election is also observed by representatives of the Holy See and other religious congregations.

Capitulants at General Chapter are the current Rector Major, those former Rector Majors still alive, the current members of the General Council, the secretary general, the procurator general, a moderator, the provincials, vice-provincials and delegates per province. The election of the new Rector Major requires an absolute majority and to assure it, there can be several rounds of balloting (Art. 153).

== The General Council ==
The General Council of the Salesians is a body elected during the General Chapter along with the Rector Major for his support. It "cooperates with the Rector Major in animating and governing the Congregation" (Art. 130). Such Council is made by the following positions:

1. Vicar General: The second after the Rector Major, replacing him when he is absent or disabled from governing the Order. It is the only position inside the Council that is only given to a Salesian priests. The other ones can be assumed by Salesian Laity.
2. Salesian Formation Councilor: He is in charge of fostering the formation of the Salesians and the promotion for the engagement of new members.
3. Youth Ministry Councilor: He animates the Salesian educative works, ensuring that priority is given to the youth and the Salesian Preventive System is applied.
4. Salesian Family Councilor: He promotes permanent relations and unity among the different groups of the Salesian Family.
5. Social Communication Councilor: He works to ensure that the Salesian charisma uses in a proper way the Mass Media and any means of communication.
6. Salesian Missions Councilor: He fosters the missionary charisma of the Salesians.
7. Treasure General: He sees for the administration of the goods set for the development of the Salesian mission.
8. 8 Regional Councilors: They lead groups of Provinces, guaranteeing that they keep in contact with the Rector Major and his Council. There are 8 Salesian Regions: Inter-America (North America and northern South America), America Southern Cone, West Europe, Northern Europe, Africa-Madagascar, Italy-Middle East, South Asia and East Asia – Oceania.

== List of Rector Majors ==
#	Rector Major	Image	Took office	Left office	Birthplace	Length of term (in years)
F	Don Bosco		18 December 1859	31 January 1888	Turin, Italy	29
1	Michele Rua		1888	1910	Turin, Italy	22
2	Paolo Albera		1910	1921	None, Italy	11
3	Filippo Rinaldi		1921	1931	Lu, Italy	10
4	Pietro Ricaldone		1932	1951	Mirabello, Italy	18
5	Renato Ziggiotti		1952	1965	Campodoro, Italy	13
6	Luis Ricceri		1965	1977	Mineo, Italy	12
7	Egidio Viganò		1977	1995	Sondrio, Italy	18
8	Juan Edmundo Vecchi		1996	2002	Viedma, Argentina	6
9	Pascual Chávez Villanueva		2002	2014	San Luís Potosí, Mexico	12
10	Ángel Fernández Artime		2014	2024	Asturias, Spain	9
11	Fabio Attard		2025	2030	Victoria, Malta	6
