= Paolo Albera =

Italian priest and educator (1845–1921)

Rector Major of the Salesians Paolo Albera
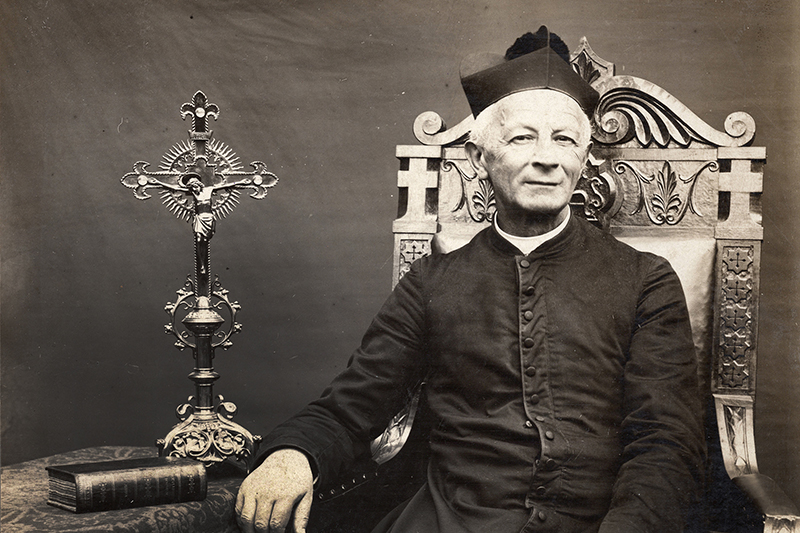

2nd Successor of Don Bosco
- In office 1910–1921
- Succeeded by: Philip Rinaldi

Personal details
- Born: 6 June 1845 None, Piedmont, Italy
- Died: 24 October 1921 (aged 76) Turin
- Profession: Priest

Paul Albera (in Italian Paolo Albera) 6 June 1845 - 29 October 1921) was a Catholic Roman Priest of the Salesians of Don Bosco, who served as Rector Major of that Congregation between 1910 and 1921.

== Life ==
Albera was the sixth child of a farmer family of None, a town between Turin and Pinerolo. He knew Don Bosco when he was 13 at the church of his town. On 18 October 1858 he joined the Don Bosco's youth center in Valdocco. He was among the first 22 Salesians to make religious vows. In 1863 Don Bosco sent him as assistant and teacher to the newly opened boarding school of Mirabello Monferrato, where one of his pupils was Luigi Lasagna, future Salesian missionary and bishop in Brazil. He was ordained as a priest on 2 August 1868 in Casale Monferrato. Don Bosco chose him to begin a new Salesian work in Marassi in 1871, and one year later, in 1872, the entire school and youth center was moved to Sampierdarena near Genoa in 1872. In 1875 Don Bosco opened a house for late vocations in Sampierdarena with Albera as director. It was the first place in the vocation of Philip Rinaldi who would become a good friend of Albera for the rest of his life. In 1881 he was designated superior of the Salesians for France. In 1891 he returned to Turin as a member of the general council, in the position of Catechist General (or spiritual director general). In 1900, he was Don Rua's special representative to the Salesian Houses of the Western Hemisphere.

=== Rector Major ===
After Don Rua was called back to Turin in 1910, the General Chapter elected Albera as the second successor of Don Bosco. He continued the policies of Don Rua to increase the number of Salesian houses in the world. But he would face a difficult time with the World War I, when many young Salesians were brought to the armies, many of them into enemy troops of the time. One of those young Salesians was Renato Ziggiotti, his future successor.

In 1913 he opened a Salesian presence in Hungary and visited the houses of Austria, Poland, Yugoslavia, United Kingdom and Belgium. During WWI many Salesian schools were converted into fittings or hospitals. Albera began to write letters to the military units around Europe where he knew there were Salesians. But the European war did not stop the growing of the Salesian order in other continents. In 1914 he approved the opening of missions in Rio Negro (Brazil), Germany and China. In 1915 Pope Benedict XV elevated the first Salesian cardinal: Giovanni Cagliero. In 1920 the Salesians arrived to Gran Chaco in Paraguay and to Assam in India as well as Central America and Cuba.

On 29 October 1921 Paolo Albera died in Turin, having been Rector Major of the Salesian Society for 11 years. Don Filippo Rinaldi became Rector Major in 1922.

== Legacy ==
In 2021, on the 100th anniversary of his death, his book A Lamp Resplendent was published.

Catholic Church titles
Preceded by Michele Rua	Rector Major of the Salesians; 1910–1921	Succeeded by Filippo Rinaldi
