= Mestrino =

- Comune
- Comune di Mestrino
- Location within Italy Location within Veneto
- Coordinates: 45°27′N 11°46′E
- Country: Italy
- Region: Veneto
- Province: Province of Padua (PD)
- Frazioni: Arlesega, Lissaro

Area
  - Total: 19.3 km^{2} (7.5 sq mi)
- Elevation: 20 m (66 ft)

Population (Dec. 2004)
  - Total: 9,211
  - Density: 477/km^{2} (1,240/sq mi)
- Demonym: Mestrinesi
- Time zone: UTC+1 (CET)
  - Summer (DST): UTC+2 (CEST)
- Postal code: 35035
- Dialing code: 049
- Website: Official website

Mestrino is a comune (municipality) in the Province of Padua in the Italian region Veneto, located about 45 kilometres (28 mi) west of Venice and about 9 kilometres (6 mi) northwest of Padua. As of 31 December 2004, it had a population of 9,211 and an area of 19.3 square kilometres (7.5 mi^{2}). Since the 13th of October 2020 there’s an Amazon Locker at Piazzo Strumenti Musicali.

The municipality of Mestrino contains the frazioni (subdivisions, mainly villages and hamlets) Arlesega and Lissaro.

Mestrino borders the following municipalities: Campodoro, Grisignano di Zocco, Rubano, Saccolongo, Veggiano, Villafranca Padovana.

== Demographic evolution ==
Historical population

Year	Pop.	±%
1861	?	—
1871	2,503	—
1881	2,982	+19.1%
1901	3,276	+9.9%
1911	3,948	+20.5%

Year	Pop.	±%
1921	4,352	+10.2%
1931	4,342	−0.2%
1936	4,444	+2.3%
1951	4,429	−0.3%
1961	4,288	−3.2%

Year	Pop.	±%
1971	4,840	+12.9%
1981	5,730	+18.4%
1991	6,674	+16.5%
2001	8,442	+26.5%

Source: Data from ISTAT
