= Camisano Vicentino =

Camisano Vicentino Camixan Visentin
- Comune
- Comune di Camisano Vicentino
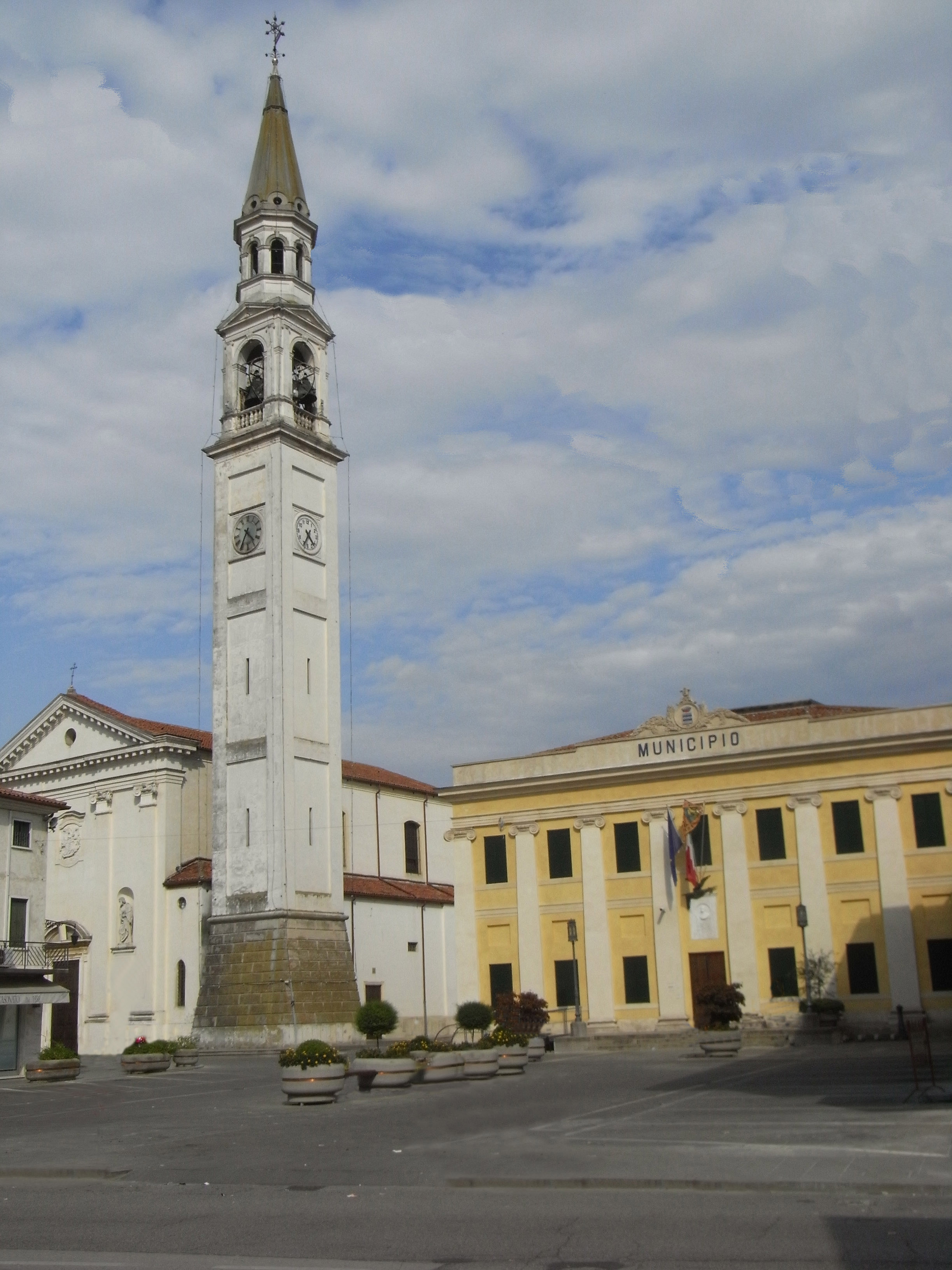
- View of Camisano Vicentino

- Location within Italy Location within Veneto
- Coordinates: 45°31′N 11°43′E
- Country: Italy
- Region: Veneto
- Province: Vicenza (VI)
- Frazioni: Campodoro (PD), Gazzo (PD), Grisignano di Zocco, Grumolo delle Abbadesse, Piazzola sul Brenta (PD)

Government
  - Mayor: Renzo Marangon

Area
  - Total: 30.02 km^{2} (11.59 sq mi)
- Elevation: 27 m (89 ft)

Population (30 November 2020)
  - Total: 11,209
  - Density: 373.4/km^{2} (967.1/sq mi)
- Demonym: Camisanesi
- Time zone: UTC+1 (CET)
  - Summer (DST): UTC+2 (CEST)
- Postal code: 36043
- Dialing code: 0444
- ISTAT code: 024021
- Patron saint: Saint Nicholas of Bari
- Saint day: 6 December
- Website: Official website

Camisano Vicentino (Venetian: Camixan Visentin) is a town in the province of Vicenza, Veneto, northern Italy. It is north of SP24, and about 8 kilometres (5 mi) from Autostrada A4.

== Twin towns — sister cities ==
Camisano Vicentino is twinned with:

- Fuerte Olimpo, Paraguay (2011)
