= Pietro Ricaldone =

Rector Major of the Salesians Pietro Ricaldone
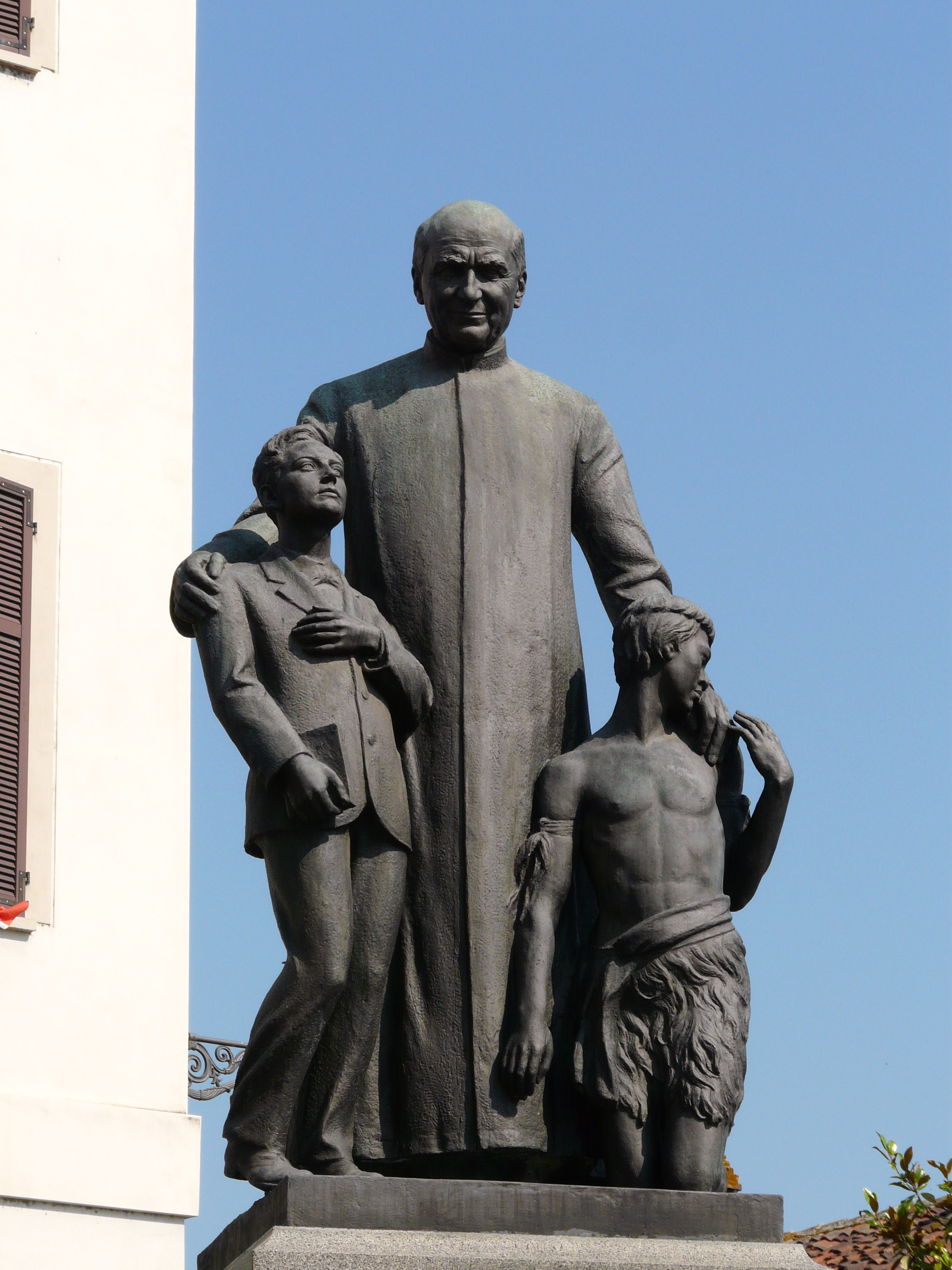
- Mirabello Monferrato-monumento don Pietro Ricaldone2

4th Successor of Don Bosco
- In office 1932–1951
- Succeeded by: Renato Ziggiotti

Personal details
- Born: 27 July 1870 Mirabello Monferrato, Italy
- Died: 25 November 1951 (aged 81) Turin
- Profession: Priest

Pietro Ricaldone (born in Mirabello Monferrato, Italy on 27 July 1870; died in Turin on 25 November 1951) was a Catholic Roman Priest of the Salesians of Don Bosco, who was the 4th Rector Major of that Order between 1932 and 1951. He was the last Superior of the Salesians that knew Don Bosco alive. He was also the founder of the Salesian Pontifical University.

== Life ==
Ricaldone was born in 1870 in Mirabello in a family of farmers of middle class. His father became major of the town. He did his first years of education in Alassio and then moved to Borgo San Marino where he knew Don Bosco – he would meet the saint only two times in his life. In 1889, he joined the Salesian Novitiate of Valsalice and became religious in 1890. He was sent as a teacher to Utrera, Spain and continued his studies of theology in Sevilla. In 1893 became director of the Salesian College of Sevilla. In 1898 Don Rua sent him to visit the Salesian houses of Argentina, Chile and Uruguay.

In 1901 was elected Superior of the Spanish Province, but also he is appointed to visit the Salesian houses in the Western Hemisphere as well as Egypt and Palestine. He is elected general administrator of the Salesians in 1922. He promoted the Salesian press, making several educative publications. In 1926, he led the Salesian Missionary Exposition in Turin and was sent to make visits to Salesian houses in India, Japan, Thailand, Myanmar and China.

== Rector Major ==
The Salesian Chapter of 1932 elected Ricaldone as the 4th Successor of Don Bosco. He was the first Superior that did not have a personal contact with the Founder, although he saw Don Bosco alive twice. In 1936 the Salesians suffered a great persecution during the Spanish Civil War in a country that was very near to his heart. In 1939 began the World War II with devastating consequences for the Salesian works, disconnecting the General House in Turin with the rest of the world. There were also several difficulties in China and East Europe. In 1951 Ricaldone reported that there were 1,900 Salesians deported, banished from their own nations or deprived from their freedom.

During his government, Pope Pius XI canonized Don Bosco and he could transferred the Salesian Theologate of La Crocetta in Turin to Rome as the Salesian Pontifical University.

== Notes ==
Catholic Church titles
Preceded by Philip Rinaldi	Rector Major of the Salesians; 1932–1951	Succeeded by Renato Ziggiotti
