= Angela Camacho =

Colombian physicist

Ángela Stella Camacho Beltrán
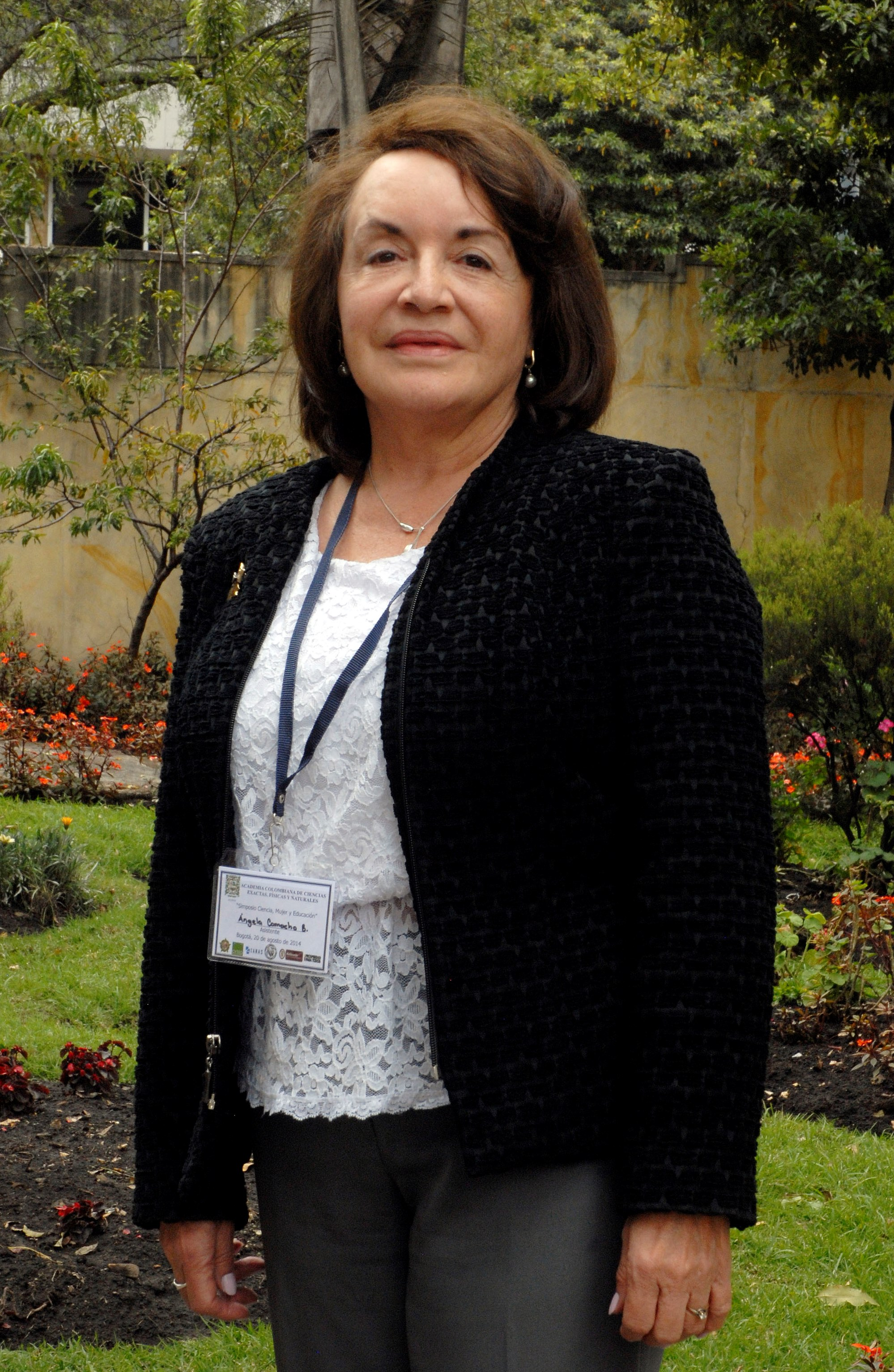
- Born: 5 February 1947 (age 79); Bogotá, Colombia
- Education: National University of Colombia, University of Mainz
- Known for: President of the Colombian Network of Women Scientists
- Scientific career
- Fields: Solid-state physics, condensed matter physics, low-dimensional physics
- Workplaces: The Andes University
- Thesis: Dielektrische untersuchungen in verduennter loesung zur beweglichkeit der oh-gruppe und ihre wechselwirkung mit der umgebenden molekuelen

Ángela Stella Camacho Beltrán (born 5 February 1947) is a Colombian physicist. As of 2021, she is the president of the Colombian Network of Women Scientists. Camacho's main work is in condensed matter physics, solid-state physics, and low-dimensional physics. She was the first Colombian woman to obtain a PhD in physics.

== Education ==
Camacho was born in Bogotá. In 1966, she started her studies at the National University of Colombia, where she received her degree in physics in 1970. Camacho then travelled to Germany and obtained a Diplom-physikerin at the Technische Hochschule Darmstadt in 1973. In 1977, she was awarded a Dr. rer. nat. by the Johannes Gutenberg University Mainz, West Germany. She was the first Colombian woman to obtain a doctorate in physics.

Upon her return to Colombia in 1978, Camacho started teaching and researching at the physics department of the Industrial University of Santander, where she remained until 1982. There, Beltrán became the research director of the physics department between 1980 and 1982. In 1982, she transferred to the physics department of the Andes University, where she occupied various posts, including: Department Director (1984-1988), Postgraduate and Research Coordinator (1990-2005) and Member of the Committee of Teacher Organization of the Faculty of Sciences (2008-2012). Throughout her professional career, she has actively participated in forming physicists, directing 2 doctoral, 11 master's and 16 undergraduate theses.

Camacho has been a member of six national and international scientific associations; she was an Associate Member of the International Center for Theoretical Physics between 1984 and 1990. She has been active in the Colombian Physics Society, starting in 1980 as a Coordinator of the Northeast Chapter (1980–1982). Later, Beltrán became the Society's Secretary of the Central Chapter (1993–1995), Principal Member of the Board of Directors (1995–1997), Secretary of the Board of Directors (1999–2001), Vice President (2001–2003) and then Coordinator of the Central Chapter (2002–2004).

Camacho was also a Leader representative for Colombia in the Red IX.e of the CYTED Microelectronics program (1999–2003), and Leader for Colombia in the CYTED NANODYF network (2011–2014).

She has been a guest professor and visiting professor in European research centers (Italy, Germany, Spain, Denmark), the United States and Mexico.

In 2003, the Colombian Association for the Advancement of Science awarded Beltrán the National Award for Excellence in Research; in 2002, the Colombian Academy of Exact, Physical and Natural Sciences elected her a Corresponding Member, and a Full Member in 2011.

== Research ==
Camacho has expertise in condensed matter physics, solid-state physics, low-dimensional physics, and Low-Dimensional Semiconductor Structures. She is also an expert in semiconductor nanostructures, optical and electronic properties, and nanostructures dynamics.

Currently her interests are focused on the interaction of light with zero-dimensional and one-dimensional nano-systems, for instance, nano-wiring that serve as models for carbon nanotubes.

== Outreach and advocacy ==
Camacho is active in supporting and promoting women in science. She was a Leader for Colombia in the Movement of Women in Physics in Paris (March 2002). Camacho helped create, and as of 2021 is President of the Colombian Network of Women Scientists, which aims to stimulate the participation of women of all ages in Colombian scientific development. In an interview in 2019, Camacho says that gender biases in young children's games can affect how they feel about science in the future, and states that there is still work to be done in her country towards gender equality in science.

== Recognitions and awards ==
- Associate Member of the International Center for Theoretical Physics, 1984-1990
- Award for Scientific Production, COLCIENCIAS, 1990.
- Member of the incentive program for researchers, COLCIENCIAS, 1994 and 1996
- Member of the Research Group selected in the COLCIENCIAS Special Call for Excellence Groups, 1996.
- Member of the Physics of Condensed Matter group, ranked by COLCIENCIAS in category A, 1999
- Member of the Physics of Condensed Matter group, ranked by COLCIENCIAS in category A, 2001
- Leader for Colombia at the Movement of Women in Physics, Paris, March 2002
- Leader for Colombia at the IX.e network of the CYTED Microelectronics subprogram, 1999-2003
- National Colombian Association for the Advancement of Science Award for excellence in research, 2003
- Leader for Colombia of the CYTED NANODYF network, 2011-2014

== Selected publications ==
Some of the publications by Angela Camacho to date are:

- J.C Arias and A. Camacho, ENHANCED ELECTRIC FIELD IN SHORT CHAINS OF METALLIC NANOPARTICLES OF DIFFERENT SHAPES Journal of Electromagnetic Analysis and Applications, 3,11,458 (2011).
- Jefferson Flórez and Angela Camacho, EXCITONIC EFFECTS ON THE SECOND-ORDER NONLINEAR OPTICAL PROPERTIES OF SEMI-SPHERICAL QUANTUM DOTS. Nanoscale Research Letters 6, 268, (2011).
- A.S. Camacho and J.F.Nossa, GEOMETRIC DEPENDENCE OF THE DIELECTRIC PROPERTIES OF QUANTUM DOTS ARRAYS, Microelectronics Journal 40, 835, (2009).
- A.S.Camacho and J.F.Nossa, GEOMETRICAL EFFECTS ON THE PROPERTIES OF1d,2d AND 3d QUANTUMDOTS SUPERCRYSTALS, 29TH Conference on Semiconductors, Rio de Janeiro, Brasil, July, 2008.
- J.F.Nossa and A.S Camacho, OPTICAL PROPERTIES OF SUPERCRYSTALS, Microelectronics Journal 39,11, 1251(2008).
- H.Ramirez, A.S.Camacho and L.C.Lew Yan Voon, ELECTRON DYNAMICS IN RECTANGULAR DOUBLE DOTS, Nanotechnology, 17,1286 (2006)
- A.Camacho, R.M.Gutiérrez and J.L. Carrillo, SCALING RELATIONS OF TUNNELING RATES IN QUANTUM WELLS SYSTEMS, phys. stat. sol. (c) 1, No. S1, S46– S49 (2004)
