= Galileo Violini =

Theoretical physicist

Galileo Violini is a theoretical physicist and the director emeritus of the Centro Internacional de Física in Bogotá, Colombia. He is the recipient of the 2024 Joseph A. Burton Forum Award "for establishing programs in physics education and research in Latin America and the Caribbean that increased regional scientific capacity, for promoting international scientific cooperation across continents and regions of the world, and for creating the Centro Internacional de Física in Colombia."

His main area of interests are science education, science diplomacy, and synchrotron science. He is participating in the project to bring a synchrotron light source to the Greater Caribbean.

== Education and career ==
Violini graduated from La Sapienza University in Rome, Italy, in 1965, and obtained the Italian Libera docenza in theoretical physics from Sapienza in 1971, where he later became a professor of algebra and mathematical methods of physics. He then became a professor of theoretical physics at the University of Calabria in 1987.

In 1985 he founded the International Center for Physics of Bogotá (Centro Internacional de Física, CIF), in Colombia, modeled on the International Center for Theoretical Physics, where he is a director emeritus.

== Awards and honors ==
- 2023 John Wheatley Award of the American Physical Society
- 2023 World Academy of Art and Science Fellow
- Honorary member of the Colombian Academy of Exact, Physical and Natural Sciences
- Outstanding Salvadorean Recognition from the Government of El Salvador
- 2016 Abdus Salam Spirit Award of the International Center for Theoretical Physics
- UNESCO Representative to Islamic Republic of Iran
