= María Teresa Murillo =

Colombian botanist and pteridologist (1929–2017)

- Born: October 15, 1929; Bogotá
- Died: February 26, 2017 (aged 87)
- Citizenship: Colombia
- Occupation: Botanist
- Known for: First woman member of the Colombian Academy of Exact, Physical and Natural Sciences

Academic background
- Education: National University of Colombia

Academic work
- Discipline: Botany
- Sub-discipline: Pteridology

María Teresa Murillo Pulido (15 October 1929 – 26 February 2017) was a Colombian botanist and pteridologist, who was known by many as "the First Lady of Botany in Colombia". An internationally recognised expert in the field, she expanded the herbarium at the National University of Colombia and was the first woman to be accepted into the Colombian Academy of Exact, Physical and Natural Sciences.

== Early life and education ==
Murillo was born on 15 October 1929 in Bogotá. Her father was the entomologist Luis María Murillo Quinche; her mother Isabel Pulido Cárdenas. From 1935 to 1944 she studied at the María Auxiliadora School, and from 1945 to 1946 at the National University of Colombia (NUC) where she studied under Armando Dugand.

== Career ==
She developed her career at the Institute of Natural Sciences at National University of Colombia from 1950 to 2006. During her time at NUC she expanded the herbarium collection held there, with particular reference to its collection of ferns. She was awarded fellowships by the Guggenheim Foundation in 1964 and 1965.

From 1965 to 1967 she worked with Rolla and Alice Tryon at the United States National Herbarium, at Harvard University. From 1971 to 1972 she studied palynology at the Hugo de Vries Laboratory at the University of Amsterdam, supervised by Thomas van der Hammen. In 1981 she returned to Harvard as a visiting professor. In 1991 she worked with David Lellinger to study ferns in the Smithsonian's collection.

Murillo was the first woman to be accepted into the Colombian Academy of Exact, Physical and Natural Sciences in 1970, and was known as one of the first researchers to study ferns in Latin America. She was known by many, as "the First Lady of Botany in Colombia", and was an internationally recognised authority on the taxonomy and economic botany of ferns.

She died on 26 February 2017.

== Awards and recognition ==
- Commemorative plaque in the Botanical Garden of Medellín
- University Merit Medal - National University of Colombia (1994)
- Integral Life and Work of a Scientist Award - Colombian Academy of Exact, Physical and Natural Sciences (1995)

== Eponyms ==
- Tectaria murilloana A.Rojas (also honors Marcelo Murillo)
- Trichomanes murilloanum A.Rojas

The standard author abbreviation M.T.Murillo is used to indicate this person as the author when citing a botanical name.
