= Luis Quinche =

Colombian entomologist (1896–1974)

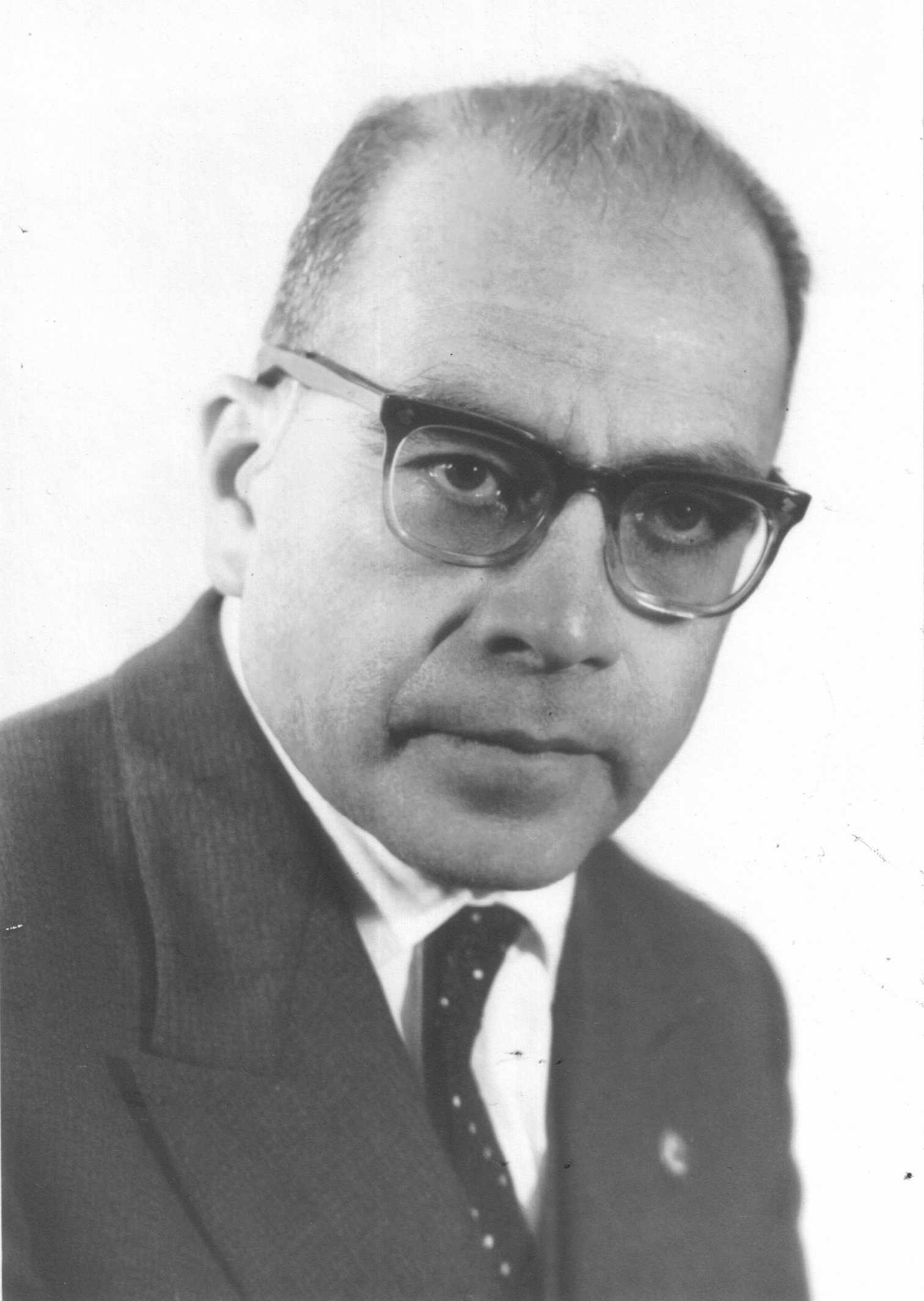
Quinche in 1962

Luis María Murillo Quinche (May 24, 1896 – September 6, 1974) was a Colombian entomologist. He was a pioneer of agricultural entomology in Colombia, introducing systematic entomology and biological control.

Quinche was born in Guasca, Cundinamarca, and studied at the Salesian College of Leo XIII and received a degree in 1917. His teachers included Santiago Cortés, Apolinar María and Ricardo Lleras Codazzi. He studied botany from the works of Andrés Posada Arango, Joaquín Antonio Uribe and Francisco Vergara and Velasco. He taught himself about insects and promoted biological pest control. In 1924 he wrote on wasps. He joined the ministry of industries in 1927 and was posted to the plant health office to study pests affecting coffee and soon became the head of entomology service. He examined the ants associated with coccids in coffee, introduced wasps of Apanteles sp. to control boll worm in cotton. He used Aphelinus mali to manage Eriosoma lanigerus on apple crops in Boyacá in 1929. In 1948 he introduced Rodolia cardinalis to control Icerya purchasi He was a members of the Colombian Society of Natural Sciences and the Rufino Cuervo Literary Society. He wrote a column in the newspaper El Tiempo called “Desde mi Universidad” (From my University) for fifteen years and also wrote in many other periodicals. He also wrote poetry.

Quinche married Isabel Pulido Cárdenas and they had three daughters one of whom was the botanist María Teresa. He later married Saturia Saturia Beth with whom he had a son.
