= 1979 UCI Cyclo-cross World Championships =

Cyclo-cross championship

- Stamp of the event

- Venue: Saccolongo, Italy; Ordizia, Spain
- Dates: 27-–28 January 1979; 18 February 1979
- Coordinates: 45°24′N 11°45′E
- Cyclists participating: 27 (Elite), 47 (Amateurs), 35 (Juniors)
- Events: 3

The 1979 UCI Cyclo-cross World Championships were held in Saccolongo, Italy on Sunday 28 January 1979. It was the 30th edition of the UCI Cyclo-cross World Championships.

In August 1977, the UCI Congress awarded the hosting rights to Italy. At the same time, it was decided to transform the Junior European Championships, which had existed since 1976, into World Championships starting in 1979. However, in Saccolongo, only the usual competitions for adult professionals and amateurs took place initially, for the first time held separately over two days. In February, the first Junior World Champion was crowned in Ordizia, Spain.

== Venue ==
The majority of the course lay in the meadows near the Bacchiglione river. Except for the climb up the river embankment, it was completely flat. The originally planned circuit was 3.1 km long, 2.4 km of which ran through pasture and farmland. However, weeks of bad weather had rendered it virtually impassable, and significant criticism arose even before the race. Rolf Wolfshohl and Carlo Lafranchi, managers of the German and Swiss teams respectively, spoke of a disgrace or scandal, and the Belgian team considered a boycott. Without a bicycle, the course was easier to complete. At short notice, some obstacles were removed, and the passage through a cornfield was eliminated, so the amateurs had to cover 19.5 km and the professionals 22 km.

== Men's Amateurs race ==
Forty-seven riders from 13 nations competed in the amateur race, including Bruno Bulić, representing Yugoslavia for the first time. The race took place in torrential rain, and about three-quarters of the course had to be covered on foot. Defending champion Roland Liboton struggled with the conditions and finished a distant 13th. Hennie Stamsnijder led for the first five laps but never had more than a 30-second advantage. In the sixth lap, Vito Di Tano made a strong comeback and overtook the exhausted Stamsnijder, primarily due to his superior running. Although the four Polish riders did not win any medals, they all finished in the top ten, securing them the team victory.

== Men's Elite race ==
The following day, the sun shone, and the professional race took place before 25,000 spectators, including 4,000 from Switzerland alone. Despite the weather conditions, the course had become even stickier and was also churned up by the previous race, forcing the 27 starters from 9 countries to cover even longer distances. Klaus-Peter Thaler abandoned the race early, as did the former world champions and brothers Erik and Roger De Vlaeminck, for whom it would be the last World Championship race of their careers. From the start, the two Swiss riders Albert Zweifel and Peter Frischknecht led and steadily increased their lead over Robert Vermeire; the five-time former amateur world champion had turned professional at the age of 34. He was overtaken by Gilles Blaser after three laps, making a Swiss sweep of the podium seem likely. However, in the penultimate lap, Frischknecht suffered a ruptured Achilles tendon (contrary to initial reports, not due to external force) and was taken to the hospital.

Zweifel became world champion for the fourth time in a row. His margin of 4:03 minutes over Blaser was the largest in the history of the World Championships, and at almost an hour and a half, the race was the longest and slowest edition of the World Championships. Lucien Zeimes finished seventh, 17 minutes behind, as the last rider not to be lapped and the first Luxembourger to finish in the top ten since Charly Gaul in 1962. Briton Eric Stone, tenth, one lap down, lost consciousness at the finish line from exhaustion.

Two weeks after the race, Robert Vermeire, who finished third, tested positive for doping. His team doctor had given him a painkiller before the race. He was subsequently disqualified by the UCI, but the riders who finished behind him did not move up in the standings. Both the UCI and the Belgian Cycling Federation still list Vermeire in third place, but with the comment that he was outclassed.

== Medal summary ==
Event	Gold		Silver		Bronze	
Men's elite race	Albert Zweifel (SUI)	1:28:33	Gilles Blaser (SUI)	+ 4:03	Robert Vermeire (BEL)	+ 8:21
Men's junior race	José Iñaki (ESP)	50:43	Bart Musschoolt (BEL)	+ 0:58	Heinz Matschke (BRD)	+ 1:35

== Men's Elite results ==
RANK	NAME	TIME
Gold medal	Albert Zweifel (SUI)	1:28:33
Silver medal	Gilles Blaser (SUI)	+ 4:03
DSQ	Robert Vermeire (BEL)	+ 8:21
4.	Jan Teugels (BEL)	+ 9:27
5.	Erwin Lienhard (SUI)	+ 10:33
6.	Richard Steiner (SUI)	+ 12:18
7.	Lucien Zeimes (LUX)	+ 17:08
8.	Juan Gorostidi (ESP)	lapped
9.	Giuseppe Fatato (ITA)	lapped
10.	Eric Stone (GBR)	lapped

== Men's Amateurs results ==
RANK	NAME	TIME
Gold medal	Vito Di Tano (ITA)	1:10:17
Silver medal	Hennie Stamsnijder (NED)	+ 0:41
Bronze medal	Ueli Müller (SUI)	+ 1:06
4.	Franco Vagneur (ITA)	+ 1:11
5.	Tadeusz Steinke (POL)	+ 1:14
6.	Mieczysław Cielecki (POL)	+ 1:21
7.	Herman Snoeijink (NED)	+ 1:39
8.	Grzegorz Jaroszewski (POL)	+ 1:50
9.	Andrzej Mąkowski (POL)	+ 2:07
10.	Fritz Saladin (SUI)	+ 2:19

== Men's Juniors results ==
RANK	NAME	TIME
Gold medal	Iñaki Vijandi (ESP)	50:43
Silver medal	Bart Musschoot (BEL)	+ 0:58
Bronze medal	Heinz Matschke (GER)	+ 1:35
4.	Radomír Šimůnek (TCH)	+ 1:53
5.	Jokin Mújika (ESP)	+ 1:54
6.	Eddy De Bie (BEL)	+ 2:07
7.	Kurt Meier (SUI)	+ 2:15
8.	Nico Verhoeven (NED)	+ 2:34
9.	Heino Pöhlmann (GER)	+ 2:44
10.	Eric Vanderaerden (BEL)	+ 3:03
