= Rubano =

- Comune
- Comune di Rubano
- Location within Italy Location within Veneto
- Coordinates: 45°25′35″N 11°47′38″E
- Country: Italy
- Region: Veneto
- Province: Province of Padua (PD)
- Frazioni: Sarmeola, Bosco, Villaguattera

Government
  - Mayor: Sabrina Doni

Area
  - Total: 14.6 km^{2} (5.6 sq mi)
- Elevation: 16 m (52 ft)

Population (31 August 2011)
  - Total: 16,631
  - Density: 1,140/km^{2} (2,950/sq mi)
- Time zone: UTC+1 (CET)
  - Summer (DST): UTC+2 (CEST)
- Postal code: 35030
- Dialing code: 049
- Website: Official website

Rubano is a comune (municipality) in the Province of Padua in the Italian region Veneto, located about 40 kilometres (25 mi) west of Venice and about 7 kilometres (4 mi) northwest of Padua. As of 31 August 2021, it had a population of 16,631 and an area of 14.6 square kilometres (5.6 mi^{2}).

The municipality of Rubano contains the frazioni (subdivisions, mainly villages and hamlets) Sarmeola, Bosco, and Villaguattera.

Rubano borders the following municipalities: Mestrino, Padua, Saccolongo, Selvazzano Dentro, Villafranca Padovana.

== Demographic evolution ==
Historical population

Year	Pop.	±%
1861	?	—
1871	1,773	—
1881	2,041	+15.1%
1901	2,415	+18.3%
1911	2,815	+16.6%

Year	Pop.	±%
1921	3,111	+10.5%
1931	3,138	+0.9%
1936	3,232	+3.0%
1951	3,602	+11.4%
1961	4,775	+32.6%

Year	Pop.	±%
1971	7,243	+51.7%
1981	10,021	+38.4%
1991	12,573	+25.5%
2001	13,671	+8.7%
2011	15,669	+14.6%

Source: Data from ISTAT
