= Juan Edmundo Vecchi =

Argentine Catholic priest

Rector Major of the Salesians Juan Edmundo Vecchi

8th Successor of Don Bosco
- In office 20 March 1996 – 23 January 2002
- Succeeded by: Pascual Chávez Villanueva

Provincial Patagonia
- In office 1958–1960

Southern Cone Region Councilor
- In office 1972–1977

World Councilor for Youth Ministry
- In office 1977–1990

Vicar of the Rector Major
- In office 1990–1996

Personal details
- Born: 23 June 1931 Viedma, Argentina
- Died: 23 January 2002 (aged 70) Rome, Italy
- Education: La Crocetta Salesian Theologate
- Profession: Priest

Juan Edmundo Vecchi (23 June 1931 – 23 January 2002) was a Roman Catholic priest of the Salesians of Don Bosco, who was the 8th Rector Major of that order between 20 March 1996 and his death in 2002. He was the first non-Italian successor of Don Bosco and the first Argentine to get such position. He was also the nephew of St. Artémides Zatti.

== Life ==
He was born in Viedma, Rio Negro, Argentina, into a migrant family of the northern Italian Emilia-Romagna region in 1931. His parents were Albino Vecchi and Maria Monti, both born in Italy, migrated to Argentina at the end of the 19th century where they married. Juan Edmundo was the 7th and last child of Vecchi. He did his first studies at the Don Bosco Institute of Viedma where he decided to follow the religious life with the Salesians. In 1942 he joined the Fortín Mercedes Salesian College, so in 1948 he entered the novitiate. Vecchi made his Theology studies to become priest in Turin at the Crocetta Salesian Theologate in 1954 and was ordained in 1958.

Vecchi started his apostolate in Fortín Mercedes between 1958 and 1960 as Catechist of the Salesian Aspirantate, then director of the Bahía Blanca's Dominic Savio College between 1962 and 1970. The Rector Major, Luis Ricceri, elected Vecchi as Regional Superior for the Salesian works of Argentina, Brazil, Uruguay and Paraguay until 1977, then he became World Councilor for the Youth Ministry in Rome until 1990. He became Vicar of the Rector Major Egidio Viganò until 1995, when Viganò died and a new General Chapter elected a new Rector Major.

== Rector Major ==
The 24th General Chapter of the Salesians of Don Bosco of 1996 elected Juan Edmundo Vecchi as the 8th successor of Don Bosco on 20 March. He was always remembered for his dedication to the youth ministry, Salesian spirituality and a dedicated writer. The same as Fr. Viganò, Vecchi ended his period as Rector Major at the sickbed, but he made that special moment of his life a reason of reflection and spirituality writing more documents about the Salesian mission. He died on 23 January 2002, and was buried at the Catacomb of Callixtus that are under the care of the Salesians.

During his period as Rector Major, Vecchi saw the beatification of his uncle, Artémides Zatti, although he died in Rome a few weeks before Pope John Paul II presided over the celebration of that event on 14 April 2002. Zatti was a Lay Salesian and he was also beatified with another Salesian Brother: Simon Srugi. He gave also a deep sense to the fact that he was the last Rector Major of the 20th century and the first of the 21st, sending several Salesian missioners around the world to open the new Millennium for the youth. He was succeeded by Mexican Pascual Chávez Villanueva.

== Notes ==
Catholic Church titles
| Preceded by Egidio Viganò | Rector Major of the Salesians; 1996–2002 | Succeeded by Pascual Chávez Villanueva |
