= Pascual Chávez Villanueva =

Mexican priest (born 1947)

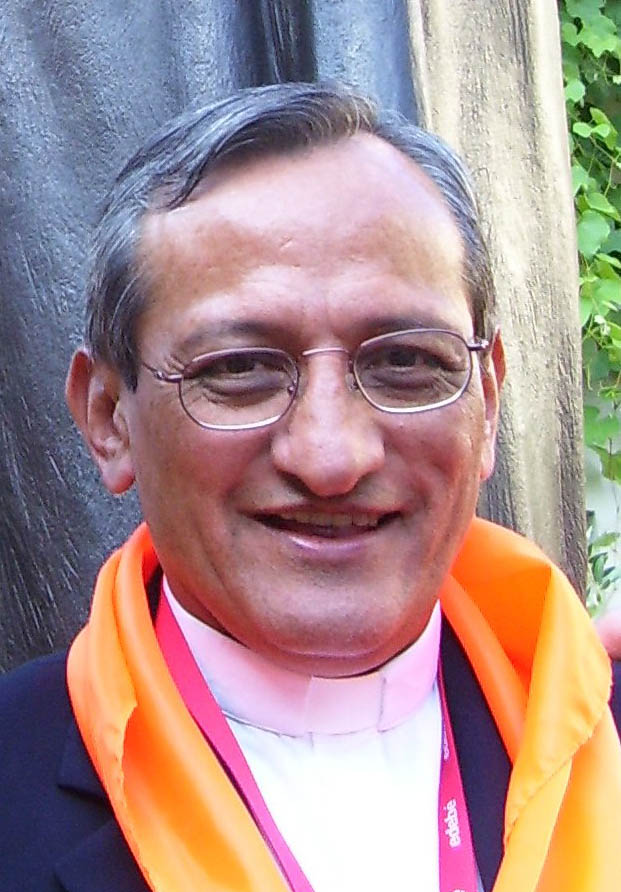

9th Rector Major of the Salesians
- In office April 3, 2002 – March 25, 2014
- Succeeded by: Ángel Fernández Artime

Provincial Mexico-Guadalajara
- In office 1986–1994

Inter-American Region Councilor
- In office 1996–2002

Personal details
- Born: December 20, 1947 (age 78) San Luís Potosí, Mexico
- Education: Pontifical University of Salamanca
- Profession: Priest

Pascual Chávez Villanueva SDB (born December 20, 1947) is a Roman Catholic priest of the Salesians of Don Bosco, who was Rector Major of that Order between April 3, 2002 and March 25, 2014, being the 9th successor of Don Bosco, the first Mexican to get such position and the second Latin American after Argentinian Juan Edmundo Vecchi. During the 26th General Chapter of the Salesians in Rome in 2008 he was confirmed for a second period, being the last Rector Major who could be reelected, because that same Chapter ruled that a Rector Major would not be reelected afterward.

== Life ==
Chávez was born in San Luís Potosí, northern Mexico in 1947, but some years after his family moved to Saltillo, Coahuila. There he attended a Salesian school and got the idea to become a religious of Don Bosco, joining the Order in August 1970 in Guadalajara. On December 8, 1973 he was ordained priest in Jalisco. He finished Sacred Scripture at the Biblical Institute in Rome in 1977, then he started his apostolate as director of the Theological Institute of San Peter Tlaquepaque, Provincial Councilor of Mexico-Guadalajara and then Provincial Superior. He did a doctorate in Biblical Theology in Madrid from the Pontifical University of Salamanca.

== Rector Major ==
His first approach to the leading position of the Salesians of Don Bosco came when he was elected as Regional Councilor during the 1996's 24th General Chapter with Fr. Juan Edmundo Vecchi as the Rector Major. He became then Councilor for the Inter-American Region, a Salesian administrative division in the Western Hemisphere that include Provinces in two continents: North America and northern South America. He would remain in that position until he was elected Rector Major in 2002.

During his government, the Salesian Order celebrated the Beatification of Ceferino Namuncurá (August 26, 1886 - May 11, 1905) in November 2007, an Argentinian young man from the Mapuche people of Río Negro Province, Argentina. Chávez wrote a book on his life, "Ceferino Namuncura, Fruits of the Preventive System" (2004).

In that same year, 2007, there was also the Beatification of the Spanish Salesian Martyrs. During the Spanish Civil War (1936 - 1939), about 232 religious and lay people were executed for their religious condition. Pope John Paul II beatified them as the Martyrs of the Spanish Civil War, in which many were Salesian priests and lay religious like Blessed José Calanzans Marqués, who was killed on November 23, 1936 in a road to Valencia. In that occasion, he wrote the letter "The blood of the martyrs, seeds of a new world" (2007).

As Rector Major, he saw the celebration of different anniversaries in the history of the Salesian Family: the 150th anniversary of the death of Saint Dominic Savio (March 8, 2007), the 40th anniversary of the Second Vatican Council and the 150th anniversary of the foundation of the Salesian Order of Don Bosco (December 18, 2009.)

He led the preparation of the Bicentenary of the Birth of Don Bosco (1815 - 2015), in which the relics of Saint John Bosco were brought to all Salesian Provinces around the world.

== Notes ==
Catholic Church titles
Preceded by Juan Edmundo Vecchi	Rector Major of the Salesians; 2002–2014	Succeeded by Ángel Fernández Artime
