= Filippo Rinaldi =

Italian Catholic priest (1856–1931)

Blessed Filippo Rinaldi S.D.B.
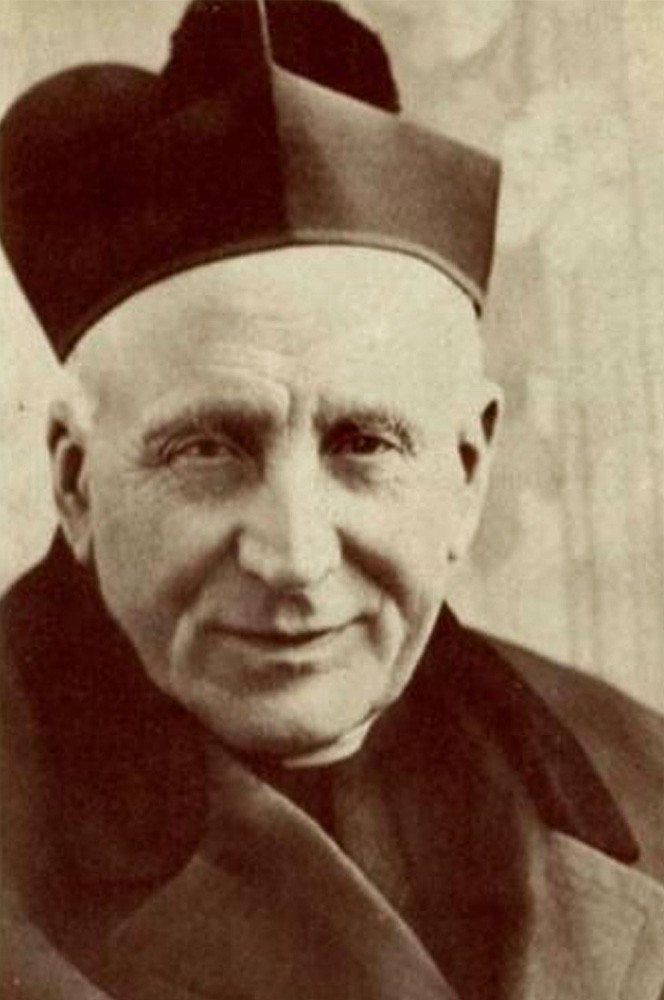
- Filippo Rinaldi on 24 April 1922

Priest
- Born: 28 May 1856; Lu Monferrato, Alessandria, Kingdom of Piedmont-Sardinia
- Died: 5 December 1931 (aged 75); Turin, Kingdom of Italy
- Venerated in: Roman Catholic Church
- Beatified: 29 April 1990, Saint Peter's Square, Vatican City by Pope John Paul II
- Feast: 5 December
- Attributes: Priest's attire
- Patronage: Wrocław

Filippo Rinaldi (28 May 1856 – 5 December 1931) was an Italian Roman Catholic priest and a professed member of the Salesians of Don Bosco; he served as the third Rector Major for the order from 1922 until his death in 1931. He founded the Secular Institute of Don Bosco Volunteers. Rinaldi was close friends since his childhood to Giovanni Bosco and Paolo Albera and it was Bosco who guided Rinaldi who was torn in his adolescence between the farming life and the religious life. The order held him in high esteem from the outset and noted the potential within him as well as seeing the charism of Bosco encompassed in Rinaldi.

Rinaldi's beatification was celebrated under Pope John Paul II in 1990.

== Life ==
Filippo Rinaldi was born in mid-1856 in Lu Monferrato as the eighth child to the farmers Cristobolo Rinaldi and Antonia Brezza. He knew Giovanni Bosco since 1861. Two brothers of his would later priests much like himself.

Rinaldi started his educational studies at Mirabello Monferrato in which the Salesians of Don Bosco oversaw his education; the assistance for him there was Paolo Albera but Rinaldi later returned to his home despite Bosco making an effort to convince him to reconsider his decision. He continued his life as a farmer but received some letters from Bosco and some books from Albera regarding religious vocations and the process of discernment. In 1874 his parents welcomed Bosco who decided to visit Rinaldi but he proved to be most persistent in his decision not to continue his religious studies. Bosco's insistence at least managed to get his parents to convince to return to the school; his mother proved more vocal in this and even some people from the town also attempted to convince him. In 1876 he prepared to wed but Bosco visited him once more to convince him that he should consider the religious life instead as a more viable alternative; in November 1877 he agreed to go to the order's house at Sampierdarena as the place that Bosco referred to as a place "for late vocations".

The director there at Sampierdarena was his priest friend Paolo Albera. It was a simplistic experience for Rinaldi to take on books but he learned to do so and joined the novitiate in San Benito Canaves in September 1879; he later received the cassock from Bosco himself on 20 October 1879. He made his initial profession on 13 August 1880 and he later received his ordination to the priesthood on 23 December 1882 in the Ivrea Cathedral from Archbishop Davide Riccardi. Rinaldi was of the mind not to become a priest but his superiors saw potential in him and so asked him to pursue a path to the priesthood. Bosco appointed him as the director of the house for late vocations in Mathi. Bosco showed Rinaldi in 1887 a map of Australia and told him that the Salesians would soon work there but told Rinaldi his work would be in Spain and not in Australia. In 1889 he was sent to Spain as the director of the order at Sarriá where he was set to work until 1901 while also serving as the provincial director for the order in his part of Spain from 1892 until 1901. In 1895 he began the production of the newspaper entitled "Lecturas Catolicas".

On 1 April 1901 he returned to Turin as the order's vicar general during the term of Michele Rua; but in 1910 it was his old friend Albera who succeeded Rua. But Albera's death later in 1921 saw the ensuring General Chapter electing Rinaldi the Rector Major and third successor of Bosco on 24 May 1922. Rinaldi helped in the establishment of the World Federations of Past-Pupils and he also helped to organize the Salesian International Congress slated for 1911. In 1925 he undertook a series of international visits throughout Europe to nations such as Poland and France as well as returning to Spain. On 20 May 1917 he founded the Secular Institute of Don Bosco Volunteers in Ivrea and dispatched members of the order to countries such as India and Japan for the missions and other objectives. During his term the number of Salesians shot up 66 per cent from 6000 to 10000 members.

Rinaldi died in mid-1931 in Turin and his remains were interred in Turin but later relocated in a Salesian-established basilica. He had suffered from heart muscle weakness from 1928 to his death. His order later received diocesan approval from the Cardinal Archbishop of Turin Michele Pellegrino on 31 January 1971 and received full pontifical approval from Pope Paul VI on 5 August 1978 right before the pontiff's death.

== Beatification ==
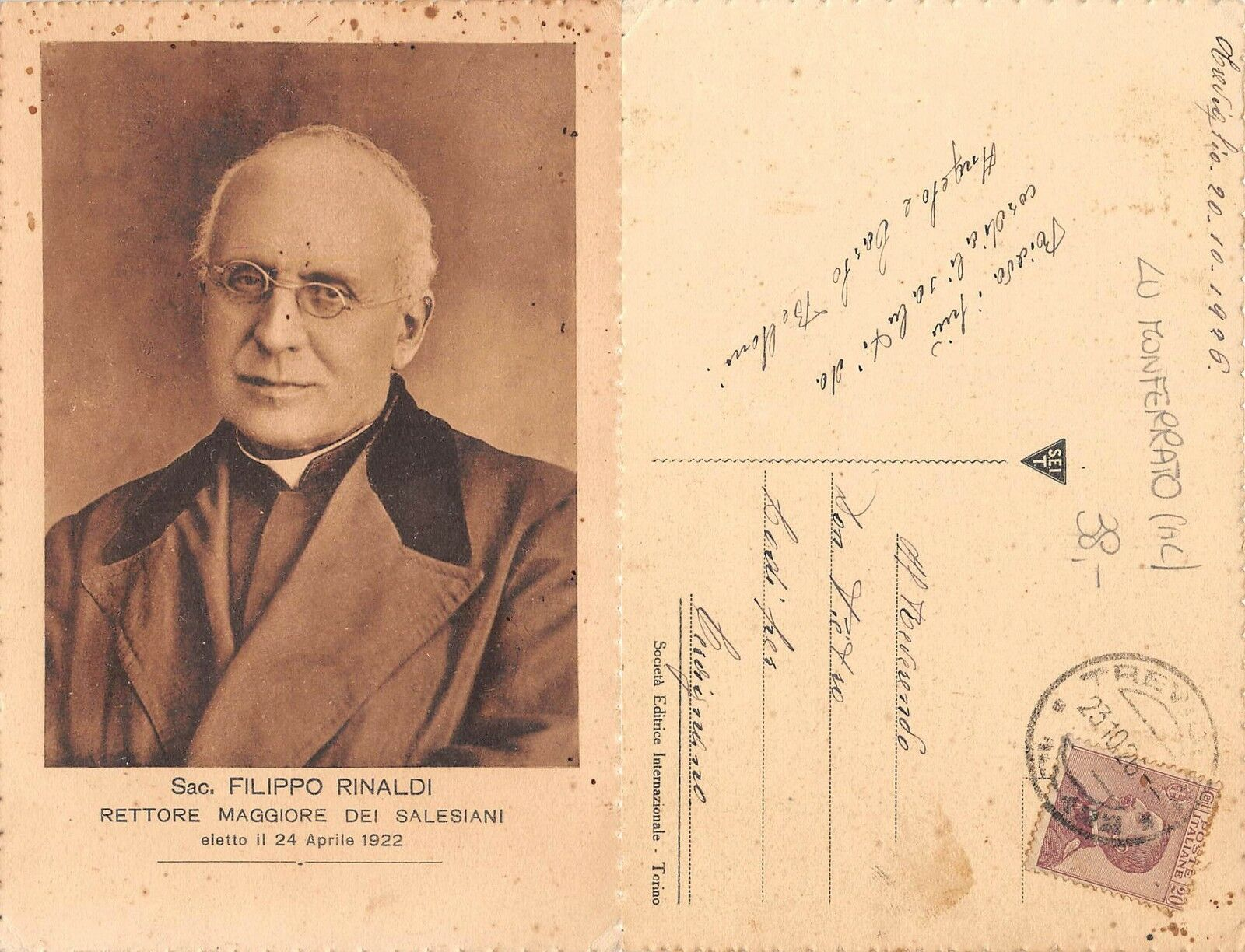
Filipe Rinaldi on a postcard from 24 April 1922

The beatification process opened in an informative process in Turin that Cardinal Maurilio Fossati oversaw from 5 November 1947 until its closure in 1953; theologians determined his spiritual writings were in line with official doctrine and so approved them in a decree issued on 19 February 1956. The formal introduction to the cause came under Pope Paul VI on 11 June 1977 and he was therefore titled as a Servant of God. Cardinal Anastasio Ballestrero oversaw an apostolic process from 1980 to 1981 and the Congregation for the Causes of Saints later validated both processes on 25 June 1982 before receiving the Positio from the postulation in 1985. Theologians approved the cause on 14 October 1986 as did the C.C.S. on 23 December 1986 which allowed for Pope John Paul II to confirm his heroic virtue and name him as Venerable on 3 January 1987.

The miracle required for his beatification was investigated and later received C.C.S. validation on 18 July 1986 before a medical board approved it on 7 June 1989; theologians followed suit on 13 October 1989 as did the C.C.S. on 19 December 1989. John Paul II approved the miracle on 3 March 1990 and later beatified Rinaldi in Saint Peter's Square on 29 April 1990. The miracle in question was the healing and regeneration of the jaw of Maria Carla who was shot in the face on 20 April 1945 at the end of World War II during a conflict.

The current postulator for this cause is Pierluigi Cameroni.

Catholic Church titles
Preceded by Paolo Albera	Rector Major of the Salesians; 24 May 1922 – 2 July 1931	Succeeded by Pietro Ricaldone
