= Egidio Viganò =

Italian priest (1920–1995)

Rector Major of the Salesians Egidio Viganò

7th Successor of Don Bosco
- In office December 15, 1977 – January 23, 1995
- Succeeded by: Juan Edmundo Vecchi

Provincial Chile
- In office 1968–1977

President Chilean Conference of Religious Superiors
- In office 1968–1977

Grand Chancellor of the Pontifical Salesian University
- In office 1977–1995

Member of the Synod on Family
- In office 1980–1995

Personal details
- Born: June 29, 1920 Sondrio, Italy
- Died: 23 January 1995 (aged 74) Rome
- Education: Pontifical Catholic University of Chile.
- Profession: Priest

Egidio Viganò (June 29, 1920 – January 23, 1995) was an Italian Roman Catholic priest of the Salesians of Don Bosco, who was the 7th Rector Major of that Order from 1977 until his death in 1995. Although he was an Italian, he considered Chile as his second home country because he moved there when he was 19 years old. He was also confessor of Pope John Paul II, a prominent theologian and writer. During the first centenary of the death of Don Bosco (1988), Pope John Paul II dedicated to him the Apostolic Letter Iuvenum Patris (Father of the Youth): "To our beloved son Egidio Vigano, Rector Major of the Salesian Society on the First Centenary of the death of Saint John Bosco - John Paul II, Supreme Pontiff." He participated also in the Second Vatican Council.

== Life ==
Viganò was the 8th child of Francesco Viganò and Maria Enrichetta Cattaneo from Sondrio, northern Italy. In 1926 he frequented the official school and inscribed at the Salesian Youth Center, the place that would put him in contact with the Don Bosco's spirituality. In 1929, during the beatification of Don Bosco, his mother made a pilgrimage to Turin for the occasion, an event that impressed her very much for the love and affection that people showed to the educator. She became a devote of Don Bosco and communicated it to her children. In 1932 Viganò entered the Salesian aspirantate in Chiari (Brescia) and the Salesian novitiate in Montodine in 1935. He studied philosophy in Foglizzo until 1939.

He applied to the missions abroad and was sent to Chile in 1939, at the age of 19, where he will continue his formation and mission for the following decades, being teacher at the Salesian Aspirantate of Macul and at National Gratitude of Santiago. he finished his theology at the Pontifical Catholic University of Chile in 1949. In 1961 he was sent to make studies in Rome for one year and returned to Chile.

== Rector Major ==
Between 1962 and 1965 Vigano participated at the Second Vatican Council, an event that would make him known to the Catholic Church. In 1968 he was elected as Provincial of Chile and president of the Chilean Conference of Religious Superiors. He was also invited to participate in the 1968's Latin American Episcopal Conference in Medellín.

He was elected as Rector Major of the Salesians on December 15, 1977, Grand Chancellor of the Pontifical Salesian University of Rome in 1978 and member of the Latin American Episcopal Conference.

Pope John Paul II elected him as member of the Synod of Bishops about Family in 1980 and president of the Religious General Superiors in Rome in 1983.

During his government, in 1984, Pope John Paul II made blessed Mgr. Luigi Versiglia and Fr. Callisto Caravario, martyrs in China. That same year he was reelected Rector Mayor on May 15 and he preached the Spiritual Retreats of the Pope and the Roman Curia.

He was also the Rector Major that presided over the celebrations of the centenary of the dead of Don Bosco (January 31, 1888). The main event was the visit of Pope John Paul II to Colle Don Bosco, the hill where Don Bosco was born in 1815, declaring the place as the Hill of the Youth Beatitudes. The Pope make Laura Vicuña blessed and gave to Saint John Bosco the title of Father, Teacher and Friend of the Youth.

In 1990 the General Chapter of the Salesians elected Vigano for a third period as Rector Major. That year Pope John Paul II made blessed Filippo Rinaldi. In 1991 the Pope invited Vigano to the Synod for Latin America in Dominican Republic. In 1993 he opened the Institute for Communication Science of the Pontifical Salesian University. In 1994 the Pope made another Salesian blessed: sister Maddalena Morano.

Egidio Vigano still as Rector Major when he became sick, supported in the government by his vicar Juan Edmundo Vecchi. He died on January 23, 1995. He was honored in his adoptive country, Chile.

== See also ==
- Catholic Church in Italy

== Notes ==
Catholic Church titles
Preceded by Luis Ricceri	Rector Major of the Salesians; 1977–1995	Succeeded by Juan Edmundo Vecchi
