= Artémides Zatti =

Italian missionary (1880–1951)

Saint Artémides Zatti S.D.B.
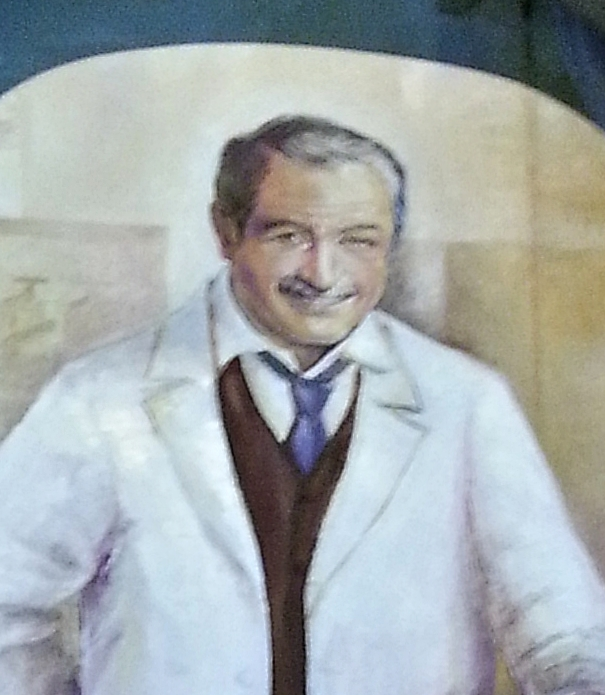

Religious
- Born: 12 October 1880; Boretto, Reggio Emilia, Kingdom of Italy
- Died: 15 March 1951 (aged 70); Viedma, Río Negro, Argentina
- Venerated in: Roman Catholic Church
- Beatified: 14 April 2002, Saint Peter's Square, Vatican City by Pope John Paul II
- Canonized: 9 October 2022, Saint Peter's Square, Vatican City by Pope Francis
- Feast: 15 March; 13 November (Salesians)
- Attributes: Pharmacist's coat
- Patronage: Pharmacists; Immigrants

Artemide Zatti (12 October 1880 – 15 March 1951) was an Italian Roman Catholic professed religious of the Salesians of Don Bosco and a noted pharmacist who emigrated to Argentina in 1897. Zatti became a professed Salesian in 1911 and became well known for his ardent faith and commitment to the sick. He was made a Saint on 9 October 2022 in the Catholic Church.

His nephew was the eighth rector of the Salesians – Juan Edmundo Vecchi.

Zatti was beatified on 14 April 2002. On 9 April 2022, Pope Francis approved a second miracle attributed to Zatti. This paved the way for Zatti's canonization on 9 October 2022.

== Life ==
Artemide Zatti was born in Reggio Emilia on 12 October 1880 as one of three sons of Luigi Zatti and Albina Vecchi. He had seven siblings: three brothers and four sisters. Zatti was baptized in 1880.

Zatti dropped out of school in 1889 due to the poverty of his parents and he commenced work for a rich neighbor. Zatti's parents believed the current economic climate was not appropriate and that their fortunes were too low. They decided to move elsewhere and arrived in Argentina at a port in Buenos Aires on 9 February 1897, settling in Bahía Blanca. An uncle of his lived in Argentina prior to their arrival. He worked in a hotel and also in a brick factory.

He met the priest Carlos Cavalli around this time who encouraged him to become a member of the Salesians of Don Bosco; he entered on 19 April 1900 to commence his novitiate as a secular member. He made his first profession on 11 January 1908. He made his solemn profession as a secular member on 11 February 1911.

Zatti contracted tuberculosis in 1901 as he tended to the priest Ernesto Giuliani – in Casa di Bernal – who had the disease and died of it on 4 January 1902; he looked after Giuliani since 1900. Sometime in 1902 he also cared for Ceferino Namuncurá. Zatti's ailment saw him move for recuperation to Viedma where he recovered after turning to the intercession of the Blessed Virgin Mary. On 5 March 1903 he became a manager of a chemist in the hospital of San José.

He attended frequent Mass and learnt the Spanish language in order to assimilate into his new home nation. His routine included morning Mass and meditation as well as a bike ride to the sick. He would also entertain the ill with a game of bocce and from 2:00 pm to 6:00 pm would visit hospital patients. He would read spiritual texts in the night following work. Zatti's work schedule spanned from 4:30 am until 11:00 pm. He also gained a diploma in nursing. One doctor said: "I believe in God since I know Mr. Zatti". He secured Argentine citizenship in 1914 in La Plata and on 23 May 1915 he began the publication Flores del Campo which was issued each week as a Christian publication.

He had a hospital constructed in 1913 and was most disappointed and displeased when it was torn down in 1941 and rebuilt into something else.

Zatti fell off a ladder on 19 July 1950 as he climbed to the roof to fix a water tank. He recovered in the hospital where he was not long after diagnosed with liver cancer after his livid skin color was assessed. He remained in the hospital from January 1951 until his death.

Zatti died due to liver cancer on 15 March 1951 in Videma. His remains were housed in a Salesian chapel in Viedma.

== Sainthood ==
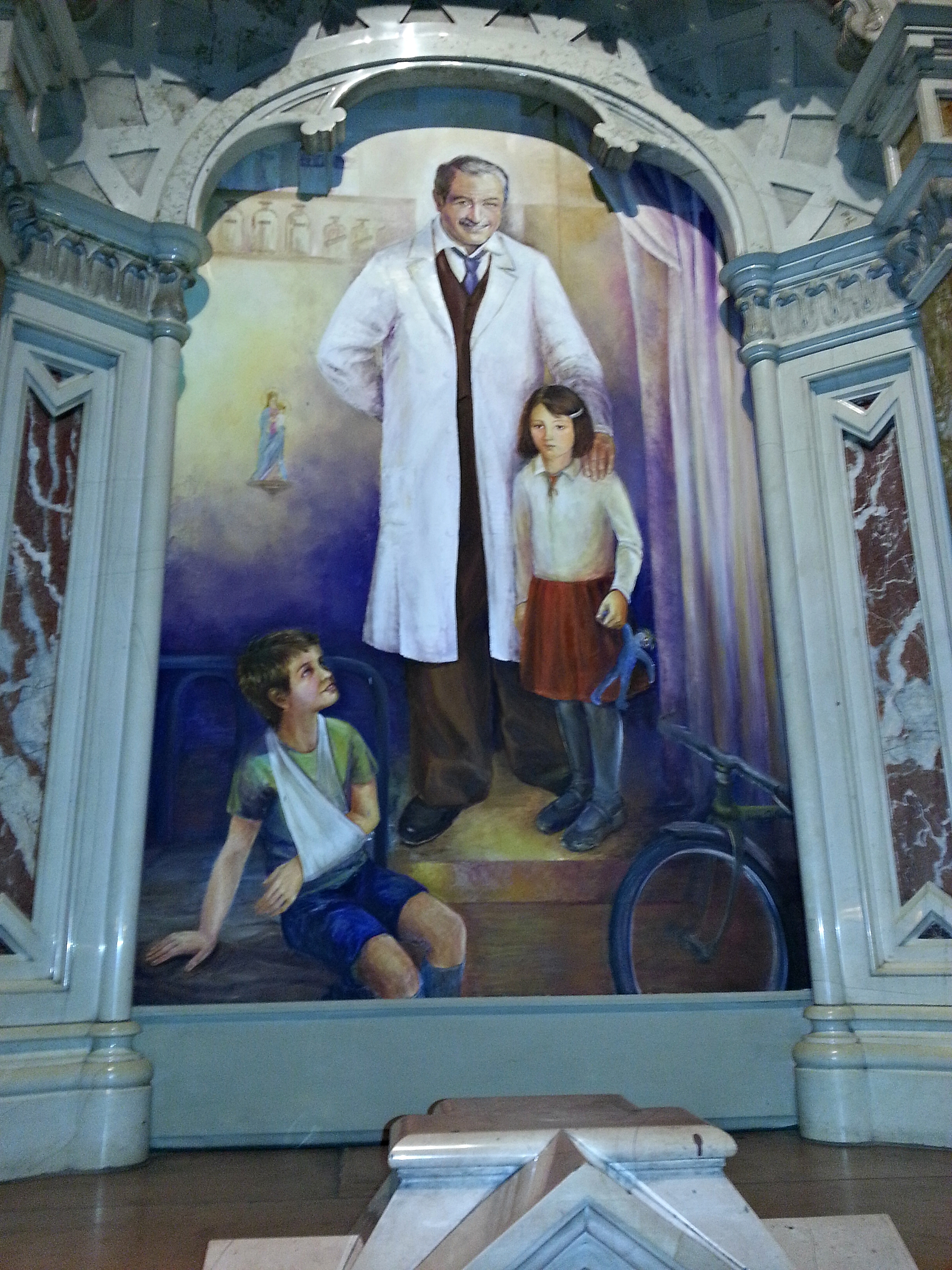
Altar in Buenos Aires.

The beatification process commenced after "nihil obstat" was granted to the cause from the Congregation for the Causes of Saints (C.C.S.) on 1 June 1979 when he was titled as a Servant of God. The diocesan process opened on 22 March 1980 and concluded not long after, which allowed for the C.C.S. to validate the process on 14 December 1984 and later assume possession of the Positio in 1991.

Theologians approved the cause on 25 October 1996 and the C.C.S. followed this on 8 April 1997. Zatti became titled as Venerable – on 7 July 1997 – after Pope John Paul II confirmed the fact that the late religious had indeed lived a model Christian life of heroic virtue.

The process for investigating a miracle opened in Buenos Aires after Jorge Mario Bergoglio – the future Pope Francis – inaugurated the process on 14 April 1998 and closed it one month later on 14 May 1998. The C.C.S. validated this process in Rome on 20 November 1998. A medical board approved the miracle on 9 March 2000 and theologians followed this decision on 27 October 2000. The C.C.S. voted in favor as well on 6 February 2001 which led to papal approval on 24 April 2001.

The postulator of this cause was Postulator General Father Pierluigi Cameroni.

Zatti was beatified on 14 April 2002 in Saint Peter's Square.

On 9 April 2022, Pope Francis authorized the Congregation for the Causes of Saints to promulgate a decree concerning a second miracle attributed to Zatti. In August 2022, it was announced that he would be canonized on 9 October 2022.
