= Villafranca Padovana =

- Comune
- Comune di Villafranca Padovana
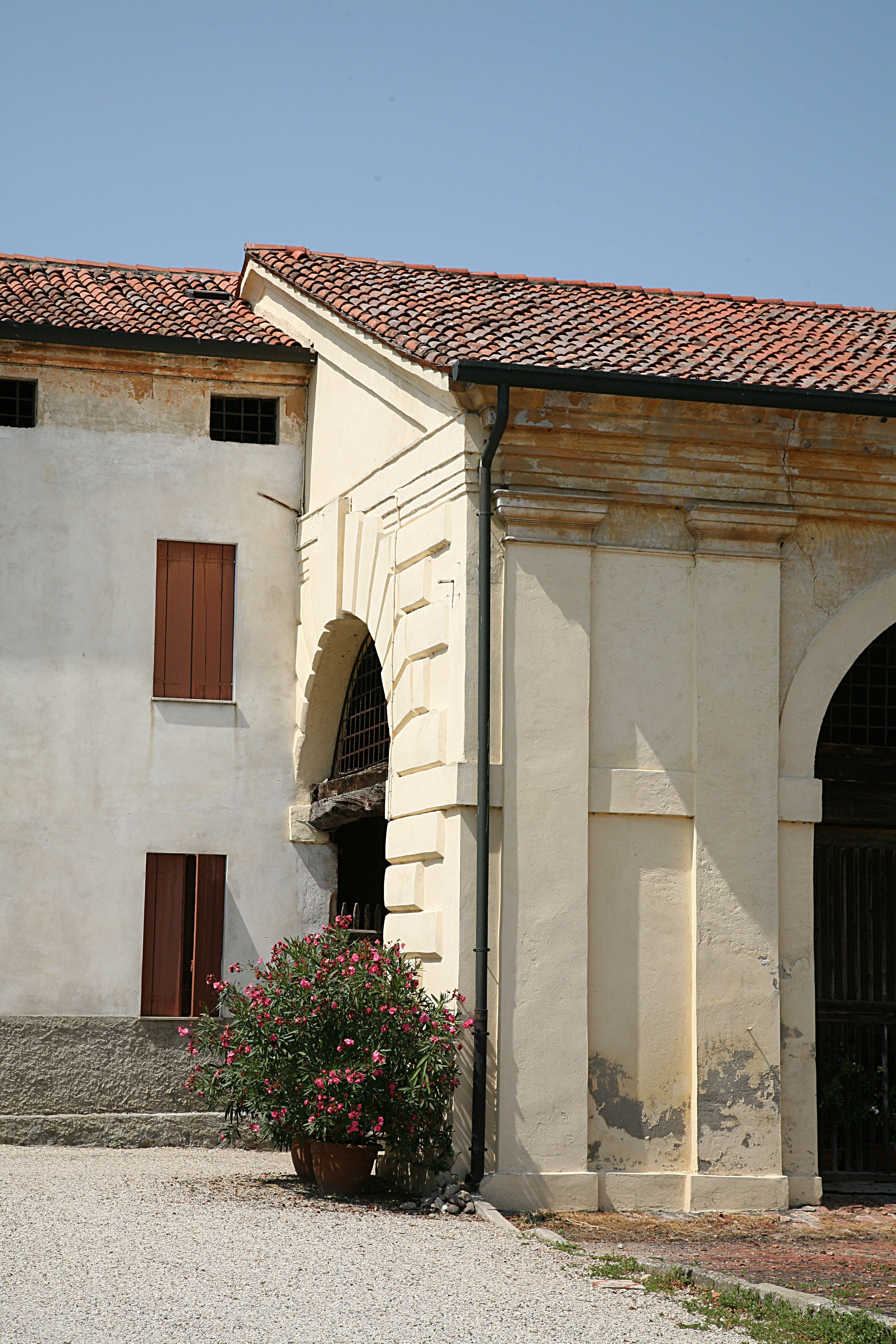
- Detail of Villa Thiene Cicogna.

- Location within Italy Location within Veneto
- Coordinates: 45°30′N 11°48′E
- Country: Italy
- Region: Veneto
- Province: Padua (PD)
- Frazioni: Ronchi di Campanile, Taggì di Sopra, Taggì di Sotto

Government
  - Mayor: Fausto Dorio

Area
  - Total: 23.96 km^{2} (9.25 sq mi)
- Elevation: 22 m (72 ft)

Population (31 August 2021)
  - Total: 10,545
  - Density: 440.1/km^{2} (1,140/sq mi)
- Demonym: Villafranchesi
- Time zone: UTC+1 (CET)
  - Summer (DST): UTC+2 (CEST)
- Postal code: 35010
- Dialing code: 049
- Website: Official website

Villafranca Padovana is a comune (municipality) in the Province of Padua in the Italian region Veneto, located about 40 kilometres (25 mi) west of Venice and about 11 kilometres (7 mi) northwest of Padua.

Villafranca Padovana borders the following municipalities: Campodoro, Limena, Mestrino, Padua, Piazzola sul Brenta, Rubano.

Andrea Palladio's Villa Thiene of Cicogna is located nearby.
