= Saccolongo =

- Comune
- Comune di Saccolongo
- Location within Italy Location within Veneto
- Coordinates: 45°24′N 11°45′E
- Country: Italy
- Region: Veneto
- Province: Province of Padua (PD)
- Frazioni: Creòla, Canton della Madonna

Area
  - Total: 13.7 km^{2} (5.3 sq mi)
- Elevation: 19 m (62 ft)

Population (Dec. 2004)
  - Total: 4,538
  - Density: 331/km^{2} (858/sq mi)
- Demonym: Saccolongani
- Time zone: UTC+1 (CET)
  - Summer (DST): UTC+2 (CEST)
- Postal code: 35030
- Dialing code: 049
- Website: Official website

Saccolongo is a comune (municipality) in the Province of Padua in the Italian region Veneto, located about 45 kilometres (28 mi) west of Venice and about 9 kilometres (6 mi) west of Padua. As of 31 December 2004, it had a population of 4,538 and an area of 13.7 square kilometres (5.3 mi^{2}).

The municipality of Saccolongo contains the frazioni (subdivisions, mainly villages and hamlets) Creòla and Canton della Madonna.

Saccolongo borders the following municipalities: Cervarese Santa Croce, Mestrino, Rubano, Selvazzano Dentro, Teolo, Veggiano.

== Demographic evolution ==
Historical population

Year	Pop.	±%
1861	?	—
1871	1,939	—
1881	2,177	+12.3%
1901	2,382	+9.4%
1911	2,987	+25.4%

Year	Pop.	±%
1921	3,166	+6.0%
1931	3,084	−2.6%
1936	3,088	+0.1%
1951	3,058	−1.0%
1961	2,938	−3.9%

Year	Pop.	±%
1971	3,345	+13.9%
1981	3,832	+14.6%
1991	4,254	+11.0%
2001	4,477	+5.2%

Source: Data from ISTAT
