= Luis Ricceri =

Italian priest (1901–1989)

Rector Major of the Salesians Luis Ricceri

6th Successor of Don Bosco
- In office 1965–1977
- Succeeded by: Egidio Viganò

Personal details
- Born: 8 May 1901 Mineo, Italy
- Died: 15 June 1989 (aged 88) Castellammare di Stabia
- Profession: Priest

Luis Ricceri (in Italian Luigi Ricceri; 8 May 1901 – 15 June 1989) was a Catholic Roman priest of the Salesians of Don Bosco, who was the 6th Rector Major of that Order between 1965 and 1977. He was the first Superior of the Salesians after the Second Vatican Council, leading a Special Chapter of the Order to update it to the new regulations of the Church. In this context, he used the sentence "Forward with Don Bosco alive today, in order to respond to the needs of our time and the expectations of the Church" that after would become "With Don Bosco and the times." He transferred the Salesian General Headquarters from its original place in Turin to Rome.

Catholic Church titles
Preceded by Renato Ziggiotti	Rector Major of the Salesians; 1965–1977	Succeeded by Egidio Viganò
