= San Juan Bosco =

- Location within the Dominican Republic
- Coordinates: 18°30′N 69°59′W
- Country: Dominican Republic
- Province: Distrito Nacional

Government
  - Mayor: Roberto Salcedo

Population (2008)
  - Total: 14,352
- Demonym: capitaleño/capitaleña
- Time zone: UTC-4
- Website: http://www.adn.gov.do/

San Juan Bosco is a Sector in the city of Santo Domingo in the Distrito Nacional of the Dominican Republic. This neighborhood is populated in particular by individuals from the upper middle class.

== Sources ==
- Distrito Nacional sectors
