= Campodoro =

- Comune
- Comune di Campodoro
- Coat of arms

- Location within Italy Location within Veneto
- Coordinates: 45°29′N 11°45′E
- Country: Italy
- Region: Veneto
- Province: Padua (PD)
- Frazioni: Bevadoro, Torrerossa

Government
  - Mayor: Gianfranco Vezzaro

Area
  - Total: 11.22 km^{2} (4.33 sq mi)
- Elevation: 23 m (75 ft)

Population (31 August 2021)
  - Total: 2,572
  - Density: 229.2/km^{2} (593.7/sq mi)
- Demonym: Campodoresi
- Time zone: UTC+1 (CET)
  - Summer (DST): UTC+2 (CEST)
- Postal code: 35010
- Dialing code: 049
- Patron saint: St. Margaret
- Website: Official website

Campodoro is a comune (municipality) in the Province of Padua in the Italian region Veneto, located about 45 kilometres (28 mi) west of Venice and about 12 kilometres (7 mi) northwest of Padua.

Campodoro borders the following municipalities: Camisano Vicentino, Grisignano di Zocco, Mestrino, Piazzola sul Brenta, Villafranca Padovana.

== Twin towns ==
Campodoro is twinned with:

- Douradina, Mato Grosso do Sul, Brazil, since 1988
