= Michele Rua =

Italian Catholic priest (1837–1910)

Blessed Michele Rua S.D.B.
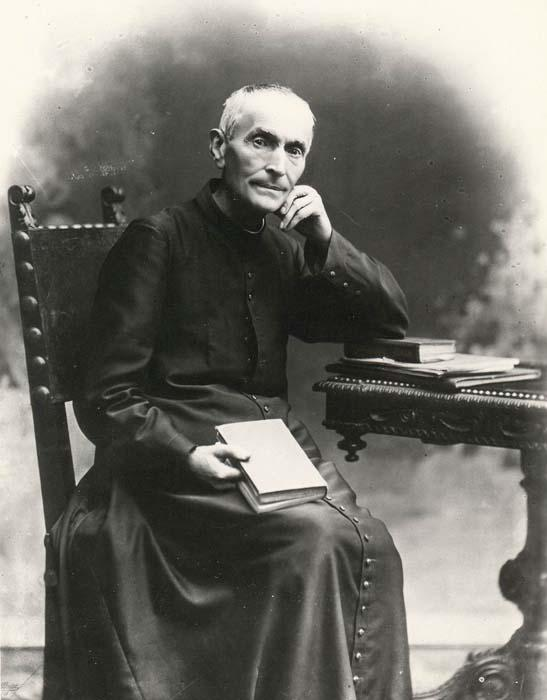
- The Second Rector Major of the Society of St. Francis De Sales (Salesians of Don Bosco).

Priest, Salesian of Don Bosco
- Born: 9 June 1837; Turin, Kingdom of Sardinia
- Died: 6 April 1910 (aged 72); Turin, Kingdom of Italy
- Venerated in: Roman Catholic Church
- Beatified: 29 October 1972, Saint Peter's Square, Vatican City by Pope Paul VI
- Major shrine: Basilica di Maria Aiuto dei Cristiani; Turin
- Feast: 29 October
- Attributes: "The living rule"

Michele Rua (English: Michael Rua; 9 June 1837 – 6 April 1910) was an Italian Catholic priest and professed member of the Salesians of Don Bosco. Rua was a student under Don Bosco and was also the latter's first collaborator in the order's founding as well as one of his closest friends. He served as the first Rector Major of the Salesians following Bosco's death in 1888. He was responsible for the expansion of the Salesians and the order had grown to a significant degree around the world at the time he died. Rua served as a noted spiritual director and leader for the Salesians known for his austerities and rigid adherence to the rule. It was for this reason that he was nicknamed "the living rule".

The process of Rua's beatification opened after his death and resulted in Rua being beatified by Pope Paul VI in 1972.

== Life ==
=== Education ===
Michele Rua was born in Turin on 9 June 1837 in a poor neighborhood on the outskirts of Turin. Rua was the last of nine children to Giovanni Battista and Giovanna Maria Rua. His father – the supervisor of a weapons warehouse – died on 2 August 1845. He lived with his widowed mother in their apartment in the warehouse which she was able to keep and where she would begin work. His father was widowed with five children prior to his marriage to Rua's mother.

Rua attended a school that the Brothers of the Christian Schools managed. It was not long following this that he met Giovanni Bosco who was working to improve the lives of the children of the neighborhood and who had just built his "oratorio" (oratory) of Francis de Sales in Valdocco. Rua was among the first with whom Bosco had shared his idea of founding a religious congregation and he joined the "oratorio" on 22 September 1852 to finish his education. One morning in 1847 Bosco was handing medals to passing children and extended his open left hand to Rua and made the gesture with his other hand of cutting the left in half and offering it to Rua. Bosco said to "take it!" but Rua said: "But take what?" No response was given until sometime later when Bosco told Rua that their lives were intertwined into doing the work of God. Bosco also sent him to Saint Giuseppe Cafasso for spiritual guidance.

In 1850 Bosco asked Rua what he planned to do in 1851 to which Rua said he would aid his mother in working to provide for his siblings but Bosco asked if he felt like continuing his ecclesial studies. Rua responded that it depended on his mother's word to which Bosco asked him to ask her. Rua's mother approved him continuing his studies and he informed Bosco he would continue his studies. In 1851 his brother Luigi died and his other brother Giovanni Battista died. He told Bosco that "next it's me" though Bosco assured him that he would live for another five decades.

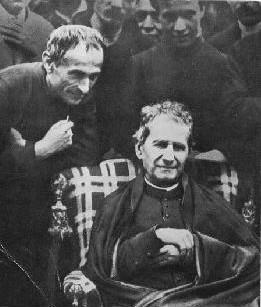
Blessed Michele Rua (left) with Don Bosco during a visit to Barcelona in 1885.

Bosco granted him and another named Roccheti the cassock on 3 October 1853. Rua made his first profession on 25 March 1855 in the new Societá di San Francesco de Sales (Society of St. Francis de Sales) which Bosco was then forming; Rua was among its first members. For over the next three decades he was Bosco's closest collaborator in the development of the congregation. The death of Don Bosco's mother in 1856 prompted Rua to bring his own mother to live at the oratory where she remained for the next two decades. In 1857 Bosco drew up a set of rules for his helpers. This rule was approved definitively in 1873 by Pope Pius IX as the "Rule of the Society of Saint Francis de Sales".

In 1858 he accompanied Bosco to Rome to seek official authorization for the congregation. He served as the first spiritual director for the congregation from 1859 even before his ordination to the priesthood which was celebrated on 29 July 1860; Monsignor Giovanni Balma ordained him. In 1859 he had been ordained a subdeacon and then raised to the diaconate on 24 March 1860.

=== Priesthood and work ===
From 20 October 1863 he began to serve as the rector at Mirabello where the congregation's first house outside Turin was located. He returned to Turin in 1865 to serve as the Valdocco vice-rector and later as the manager for the "Letture Cattoliche" (Catholic Readings). But he also returned to Turin to aid an ill Bosco but fell ill himself with peritonitis in 1868 deemed incurable. But Bosco said he would live and he was out of danger within the week. He made his final profession on 15 November 1865. Rua was also involved in the formation of new candidates and was the first director for the Salesian Sisters which had been founded in 1872.

=== Salesian leadership and Rector Major ===
[[File:First-Salesians-in-Boston winter-1897 Don-Rua-letter.png|thumb|

Don Rua in Boston: (US; 1897)
Seating left to right: Raphael Piperni; Michael Rua; Valentino Cassini; standing: Seminarian Joseph Oreni; Coadjutor Nicholas Imielinski]]

Rua was a constant companion of Bosco on his trips and became the vicar for the congregation in 1865. On 24 September 1885 he was designated as Bosco's successor after the saint made the explicit request to Pope Leo XIII himself though would not succeed him until Bosco died. He was designated as Rector Major in 1888 after Bosco's death and met with Leo XIII after in a private audience. Leo XIII advised Rua to hold off on the order's expansion until he could consolidate the foundation that Bosco had worked to build. Rua was nicknamed as "The Living Rule" due to his austerity and his strict adherence to the rule; he was also known for his tender approach and thoughtfulness to people. He made frequent visits to Salesian houses in Europe and in the Middle East and made constant referrals to the example of the late Bosco. Rua travelled to France and the Netherlands in 1890. He visited England for the first time in 1893, US in winter 1897 and visited both Algeria and Portugal in 1899. In 1900 he visited Tunisia and in 1904 visited Belgium as well as Switzerland and Poland; he later visited Malta in 1906. He visited Jerusalem and Palestine in 1908 and also to Austria. Pope Pius X asked him in 1908 to oversee the construction of a church dedicated to Santa Maria Liberatore.

=== Death ===
[[File:Don-Ricaldone-Rua-Rinaldi 1900.jpg|thumb|left|

Seating left to right around 1900 3 Rectors Major – current and futures:
Don Ricaldone, Don Rua, Don Rinaldi]]

Rua died at the age of 73 on 6 April 1910 at 9:30 am after having been ill since the fall in 1909; his remains are housed in Turin in the Basilica di Nostra Signora Aiuto dei Cristiani. His tenure saw the Salesian Society grow from 773 to 4000 Salesians, from 57 to 345 communities, from 6 to 34 Provinces in 33 countries around the world.

== Beatification ==
The beatification process opened in the Archdiocese of Turin in an informative process that Cardinal Agostino Richelmy inaugurated on 2 May 1922 and that Cardinal Maurilio Fossati closed on 8 May 1939. Rua's spiritual writings were approved by theologians on 22 May 1935. The formal introduction to the cause came under Pope Pius XI on 15 January 1936 and Rua became titled as a Servant of God. Rua became Venerable on 26 June 1953 after Pope Pius XII confirmed his life of heroic virtue.

Pope Paul VI beatified Rua on 29 October 1972 in Saint Peter's Square and during the beatification Paul VI declared:

The Salesian Family had its origin in Don Bosco, its continuity in Don Rua... He made the example of Don Bosco into a school, his Rule into a spirit, his holiness into a model; he made a spring into a river.

The current postulator for Rua's cause of canonization is the Salesian priest Pierluigi Cameroni.

== Sources ==
- A. Amadei. Il servo di Dio Michele Rua. Turin: SEI, 1931.
- A. Auffray. Don Michele Rua. Turin: SEI, 1933.
- E. Ceria. Vita del Servo di Dio Don Michele Rua. Turin: SEI, 1949.
- F. Desramaut, SDB. Vie de Don Michel Rua, Premier successeur de Don Bosco. Rome: Libreria Ateneo Salesiano, 2009.
- G.B. Francesia. Don Michele Rua. Turin, 1911.
- Lettere circolari di Don Michele Rua ai Salesiani. Turin: Direzione Generale delle Opere Salesiane, 1965.
- Sacra Rituum Congregatione. Taurinen. Beatificationis et Canonizationis Servi Dei Michaelis Rua – Positio super Virtutibus. Romae: Typis Guerra et Belli, 1947.

Catholic Church titles
Preceded by John Bosco	Rector Major of the Salesians; 1888–1910	Succeeded by Paolo Albera
