= Selvazzano Dentro =

- Comune
- Comune di Selvazzano Dentro
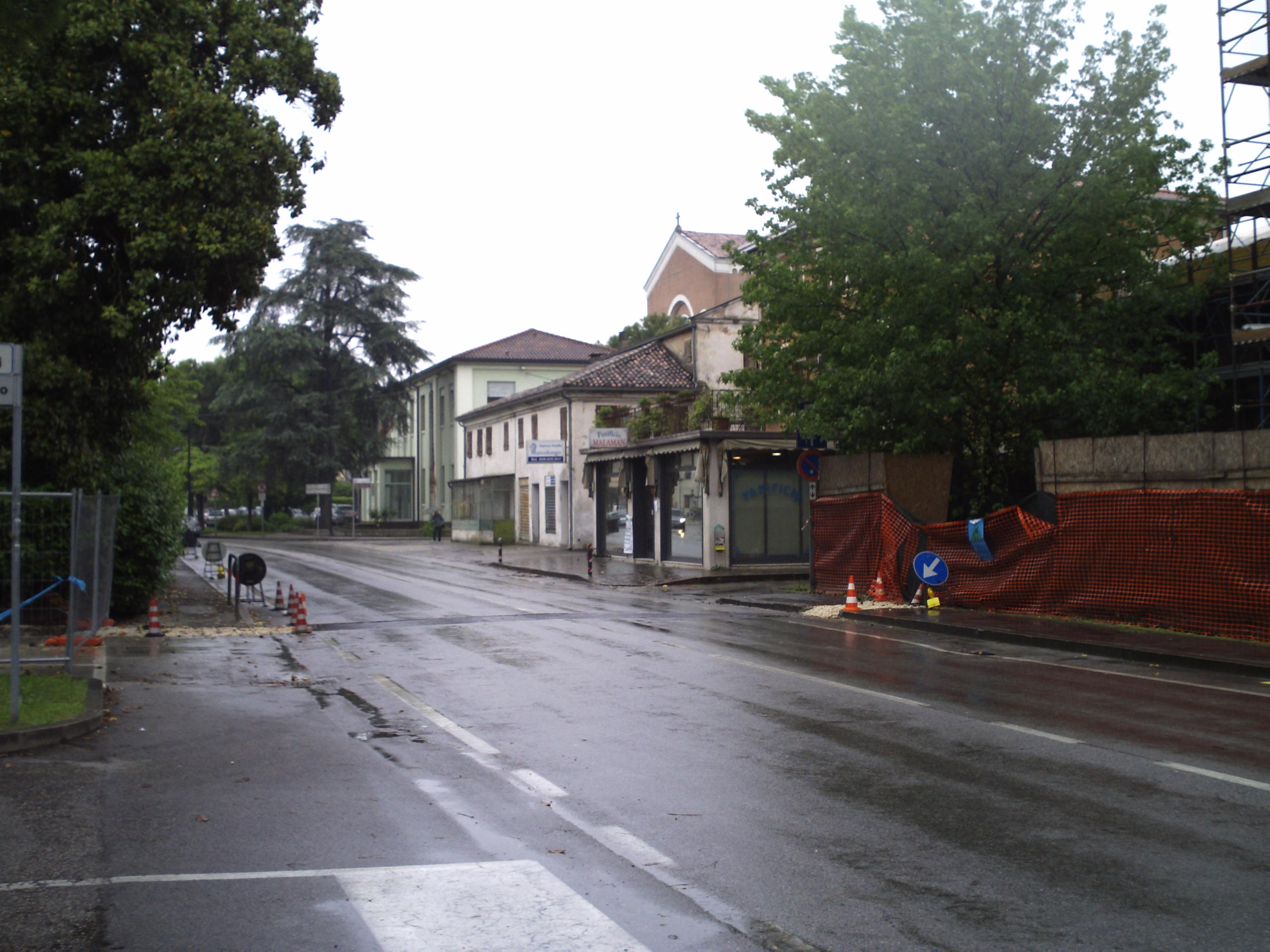

- Coat of arms

- Location within Italy Location within Veneto
- Coordinates: 45°23′N 11°47′E
- Country: Italy
- Region: Veneto
- Province: Padua (PD)
- Frazioni: Caselle, Feriole, Montecchia, San Domenico, Tencarola

Government
  - Mayor: Claudio Piron (Partito Democratico)

Area
  - Total: 19.58 km^{2} (7.56 sq mi)
- Elevation: 18 m (59 ft)

Population (31 December 2010)
  - Total: 22,305
  - Density: 1,139/km^{2} (2,950/sq mi)
- Demonym: Selvazzanesi
- Time zone: UTC+1 (CET)
  - Summer (DST): UTC+2 (CEST)
- Postal code: 35030
- Dialing code: 049
- Patron saint: St. Michae Archangel
- Website: Official website

Selvazzano Dentro is a comune (municipality) in the province of Padua, Veneto, northeast Italy, located about 40 kilometres (25 mi) west of Venice and about 8 kilometres (5 mi) southwest of Padua.
