= Grisignano di Zocco =

- Comune
- Comune di Grisignano di Zocco
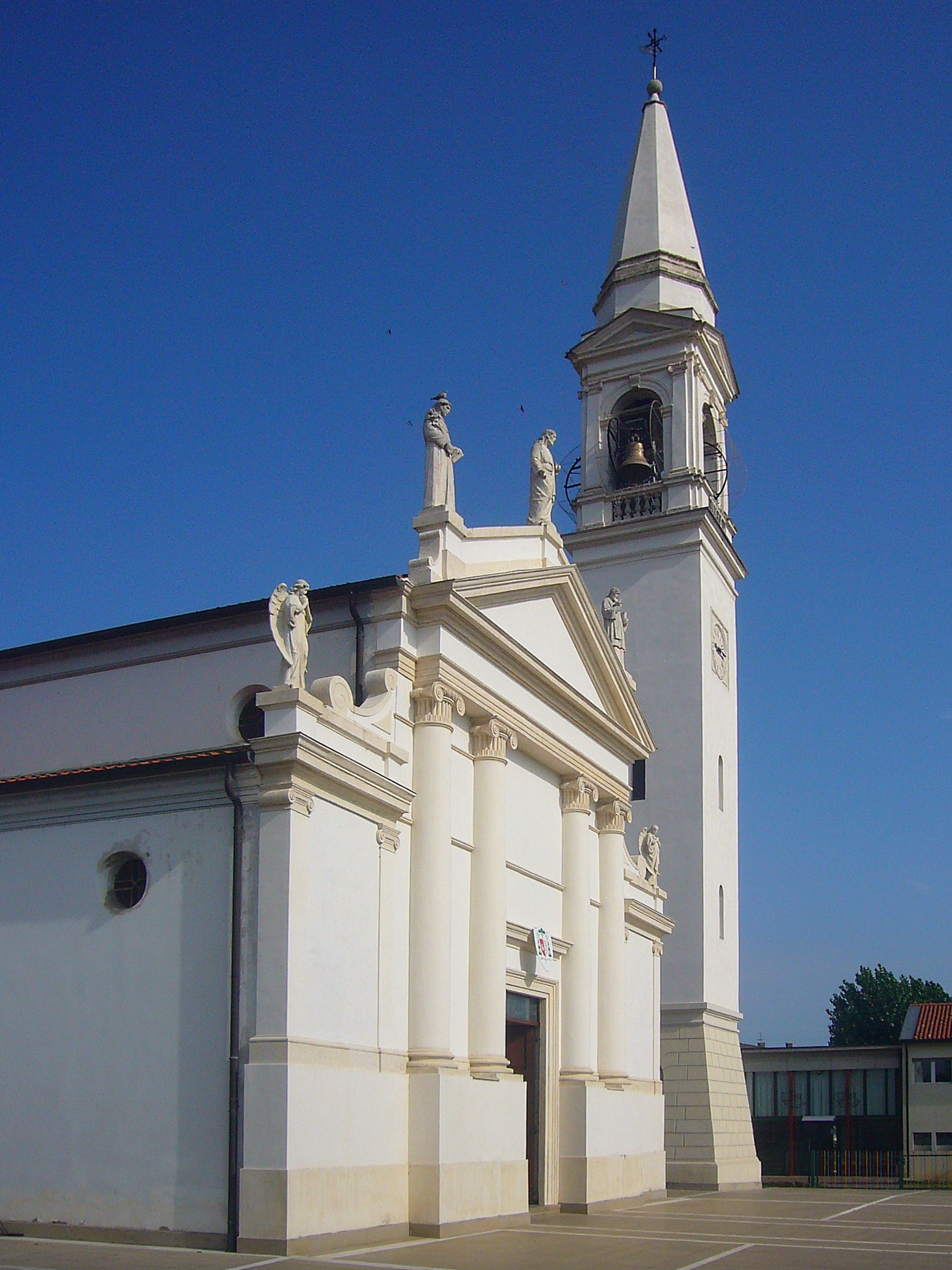
- View of Grisignano di Zocco

- Location within Italy Location within Veneto
- Coordinates: 45°29′N 11°42′E
- Country: Italy
- Region: Veneto
- Province: Vicenza (VI)
- Frazioni: Barbano, Poiana di Granfion

Area
  - Total: 17.02 km^{2} (6.57 sq mi)
- Elevation: 23 m (75 ft)

Population (31 January 2009)
  - Total: 4,305
  - Density: 252.9/km^{2} (655.1/sq mi)
- Time zone: UTC+1 (CET)
  - Summer (DST): UTC+2 (CEST)
- Postal code: 36040
- Dialing code: 0444
- ISTAT code: 024046
- Website: Official website

Grisignano di Zocco is a town in the province of Vicenza, Veneto, Italy. It is south of E70.

It is an important traffic node because of the local highway junction, that allows businesses within a 16-kilometre (10 mi) radius access to the Autostrada A4, the main highway in Northern Italy crossing it west to east.

It is also famous for the "Fiera del Soco", a centuries-old fair.

== Sources ==
- (Google Maps)
