= Colombian Academy of Exact, Physical, and Natural Sciences =

The Colombian Academy of Exact, Physical and Natural Sciences (ACCEFYN; Spanish: Academia Colombiana de Ciencias Exactas, Físicas y Naturales) is a Colombian entity in charge of the development of the exact, physical and natural sciences in Colombia.

== Structure ==
The management of the academy is held by a board of directors elected individually by the voting members, every three years. Its members can be re-elected in office for a maximum of two consecutive times.

The academy is Correspondent of the Royal Academy of Exact, Physical and Natural Sciences of Madrid. It is a member of the International Council for Science (ICSU), the International Union of History and Philosophy of Science (IUHPS) and its Division of History of Science (DHS). It is also the promoter of several scientific unions in Latin America and the Caribbean.

== History ==
Although the background of the academy go back to the government of Francisco de Paula Santander (who founded in 1826 the National Academy of Colombia), the academy was recognized by law 34 of 1933 like advising organism of the national government in scientific subjects. Decree 1218 of 1936 regulated the mentioned law.

== Areas of interest ==
Among the areas of interest of the academy are: history and philosophy of science, conservation biology, protected areas, science education, women in science, science scope and science policy.

Each year, the academy publishes books related to science such as scientific books, textbooks and dissemination material. Its main publication is the Journal of the Colombian Academy of Exact, Physical and Natural Sciences, which publishes unpublished research articles in the areas of physical sciences, natural sciences, earth sciences, human sciences, biomedical sciences and chemical sciences.
