= Mirabello Monferrato =

- Comune
- Comune di Mirabello Monferrato
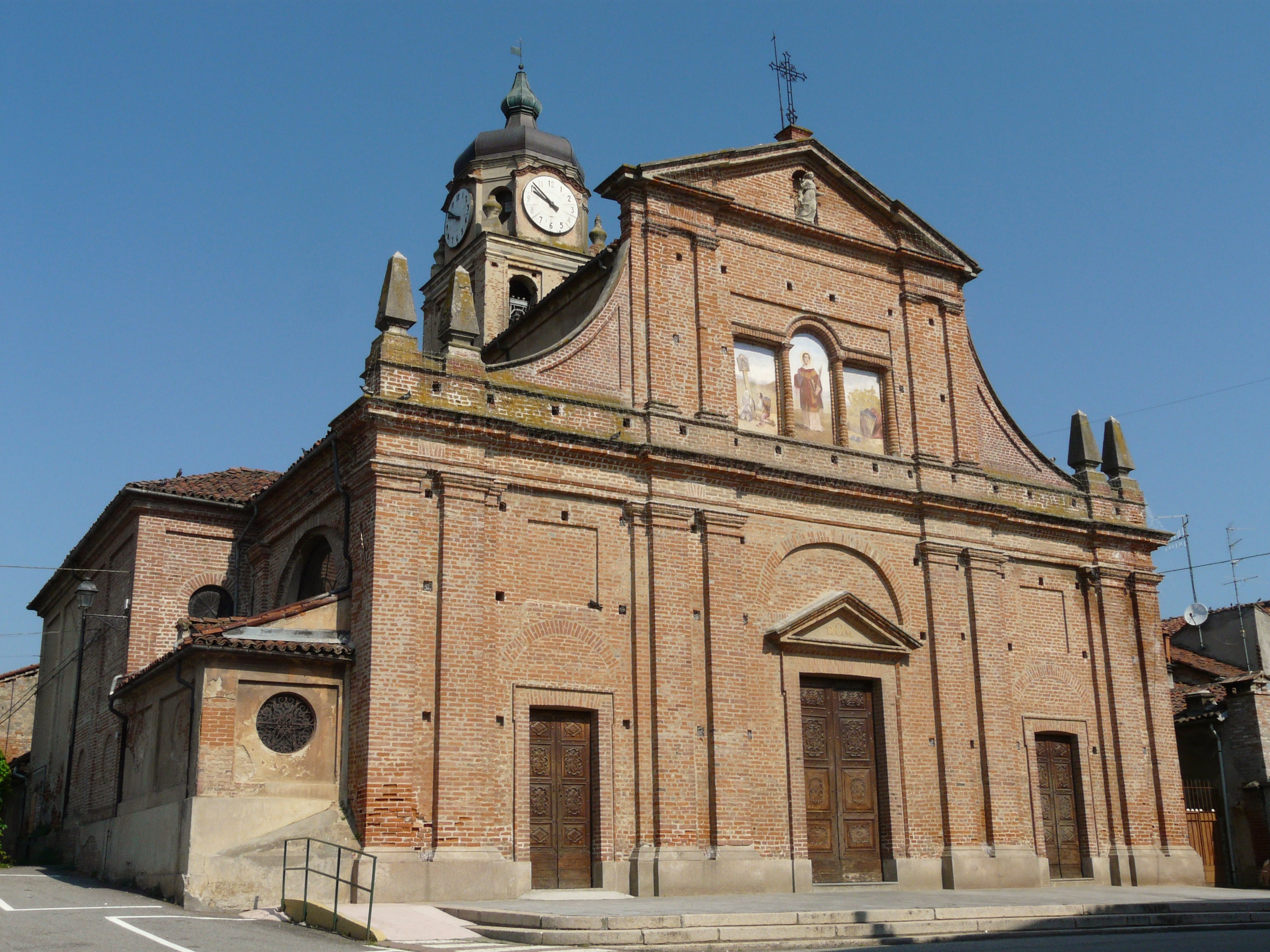
- Parish church of San Vincenzo.

- Coat of arms

- Location within Italy Location within Piedmont
- Coordinates: 45°2′N 8°32′E
- Country: Italy
- Region: Piedmont
- Province: Alessandria (AL)

Government
  - Mayor: Marco Ricaldone

Area
  - Total: 13.24 km^{2} (5.11 sq mi)
- Elevation: 124 m (407 ft)

Population (31 December 2018)
  - Total: 1,309
  - Density: 98.87/km^{2} (256.1/sq mi)
- Demonym: Mirabellesi
- Time zone: UTC+1 (CET)
  - Summer (DST): UTC+2 (CEST)
- Postal code: 15040
- Dialing code: 0142
- Website: Official website

Mirabello Monferrato is a comune (municipality) in the Province of Alessandria in the Italian region of Piedmont, located about 70 kilometres (43 mi) east of Turin and about 15 kilometres (9 mi) northwest of Alessandria.

Mirabello Monferrato borders the following municipalities: Giarole, Lu e Cuccaro Monferrato, Occimiano, San Salvatore Monferrato, and Valenza.
