= Euganean Hills =

Group of hills in Veneto, Italy

Coordinates: 45°19′N 11°40′E

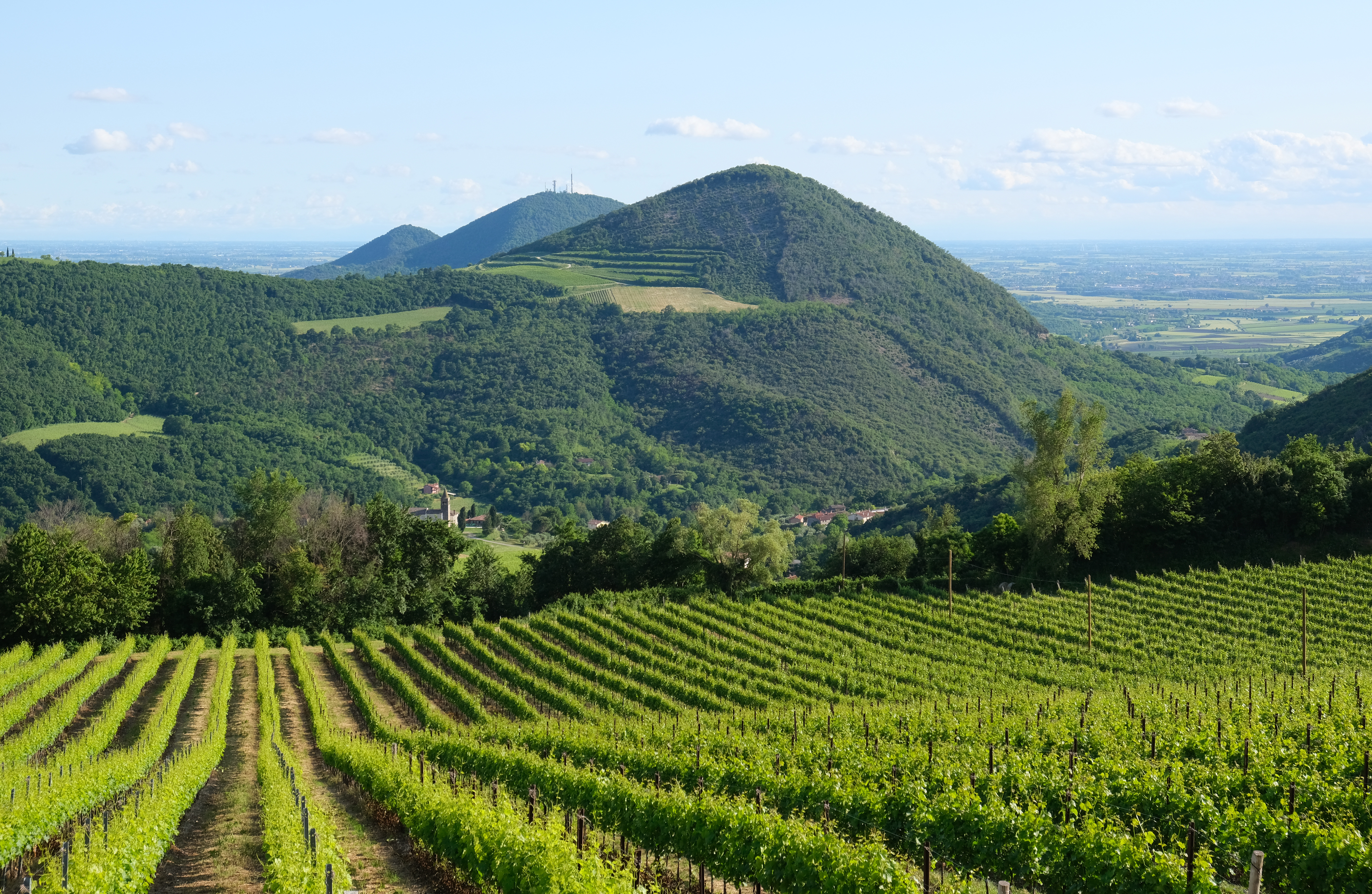
Euganean Hills, Monte Rusta in the foreground

The Euganean Hills (Italian: Colli Euganei [ˈkɔlli euˈɡaːnei]) are a group of hills in Italy of volcanic origin, created by volcanic cones or lava flows, which rise to heights of 300 to 600 m from the Padovan-Venetian plain a few km south of Padua. The Colli Euganei form the first Regional Park established in Veneto (1989), occupying an area with a roughly elliptical perimeter of almost 22,000 hectares, comprising 81 hills and fifteen municipalities. In 2024 the Colli Euganei joined the UNESCO World Network of Biosphere Reserves.

== History ==
The name Colli Euganei came into being relatively late, between the 13th and 16th centuries, and memorializes the Euganei, an ancient people who inhabited the region before the arrival of the Veneti (and was later used as a learned term to mean "Paduan").

The Euganean Hills were formed through a series of volcanic events, in two phases, the first about 43 million years ago during the Eocene, and the second (which gave the region its present shape) around 35 million years ago during the Oligocene. The hills were formed through submarine eruptions in which underwater lava flows of basalt came through open fractures and mixed with water, and especially in the second phase during an episode of activity characterized by viscous magma, which formed deposits of trachyte.

Just visible from Venice, the Euganean Hills have been known since prehistory for their hot springs and have been celebrated at least from the Middle Ages for their beauty. Towards the end of his life Francesco Petrarch (d. 1374) discovered the village of Arquà, in the south of the hills, and moved there for the last years of his life. On March 23 1374, a few months before his death (18-19 July 1374), he received a letter from Luca da Penna (the Papal Secretary) and noted in his response, written on April 27 1374, that da Penna's letter had reached him in the "Euganean Hills, where, old and infirm, I lead the solitary life I have enjoyed since youth, loving the country, hating the cities". He recorded in an earlier letter (probably written between 1371 and 1373) to his brother Gherardo, a Carthusian friar, that:

"Therefore, not to go too far from a church, I built a small but decent, delightful house in these Euganean Hills, not more than ten miles from the city of Padua; and I have bought olive groves and some vines, which more than suffice for my modest little household."

The house may have been dedicated to Petrarch by Francesco I of Carrara, Lord of Padova; it still survives (with some later adaptations) and is now a museum. In 1868 the village of Arquà added 'Petrarca' to its name in honour of the poet so that it is today Arquà Petrarca.

The topographical setting of the Colli Euganei, like an archipelago of steep-sided wooded islands rising from the perfectly flat agricultural plain, inspired the setting of Percy Bysshe Shelley's Lines Written Among the Euganean Hills. Shelley likens the hill he has found himself upon, at first to an island in "the deep wide sea of Misery", then he sees that:

Beneath is spread like a green sea
The waveless plain of Lombardy,
Bounded by the vaporous air,
Islanded by cities fair;
Underneath Day's azure eyes
Ocean's nursling, Venice lies,
A peopled labyrinth of walls,
Amphitrite's destin'd halls,
Which her hoary sire now paves
With his blue and beaming waves.

== The Euganean Hills Regional Park ==
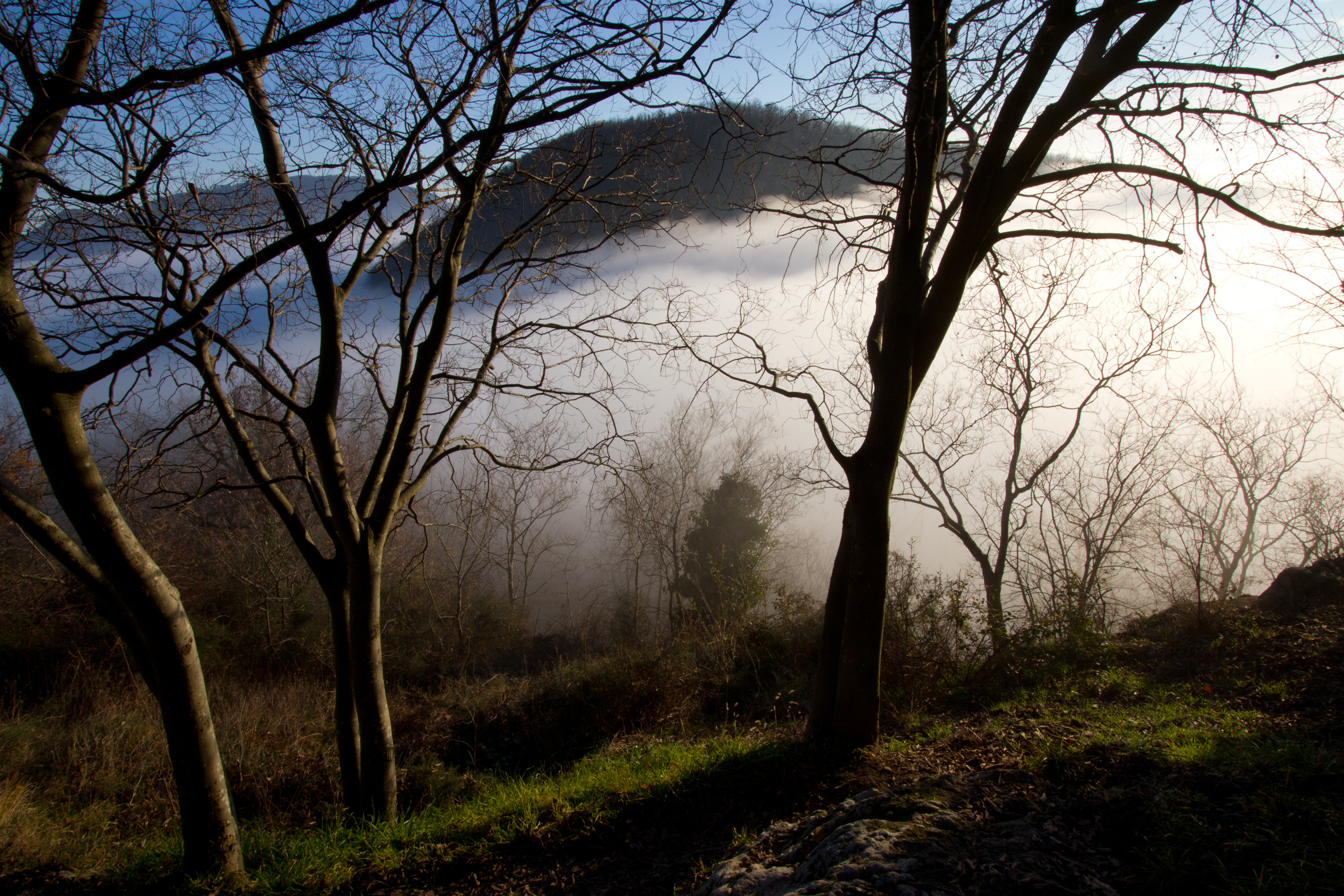
The phenomenon of thermal inversion on Euganean Hills

The Parco Regionale dei Colli Euganei was established in 1989 by the Veneto Region. It covers an area of about 18,000 hectares. The park offers a wide choice of recreational, natural world, historical and tourist activities.

== Mountains and hills ==
- Monte Venda - 603 m (1,978 ft)
- Monte Rua - 416 m (1,365 ft)
- Monte Rusta - 396 m (1,299 ft)
- Monte Cinto - 282 m (925 ft)
- Monte Ceva - 225 m (738 ft)
- Monte Cecilia - 199 m (653 ft)

== Communes of the Euganean Hills ==
- Abano Terme
- Arquà Petrarca
- Baone
- Battaglia Terme
- Cervarese Santa Croce
- Cinto Euganeo
- Este
- Galzignano Terme
- Lozzo Atestino
- Monselice
- Montegrotto Terme
- Rovolon
- Teolo
- Torreglia
- Vò

== Wines of the Colli Euganei ==
Thirteen wineries have grouped together under the recently established Colli Euganei denomination. Wines consist of the White, with its typical straw-yellow colour and jasmine scent, the Cabernet Franc and Cabernet Sauvignon reds, the Chardonnay, the Fior d’Arancio, the very sweet yellow Moscato, the Merlot, the Novello, the dry Pinello, Pinot blanc, Red Wine, the sparkling Serprino and the Tocai Italico ("Italic Tokay").
