= Rusta =

Rusta may refer to:

- Rusta, Iran, a village in Miankuh-e Moguyi Rural District, Iran
- Monte Rusta, mountain of the Veneto, Italy
- RUSTA, network of private institutions in Abidjan, Côte d'Ivoire

== See also ==
- Rosta (disambiguation)
- Rousta (disambiguation)
- Rustah (disambiguation)
