= Monte Venda =

Mountain in Italy

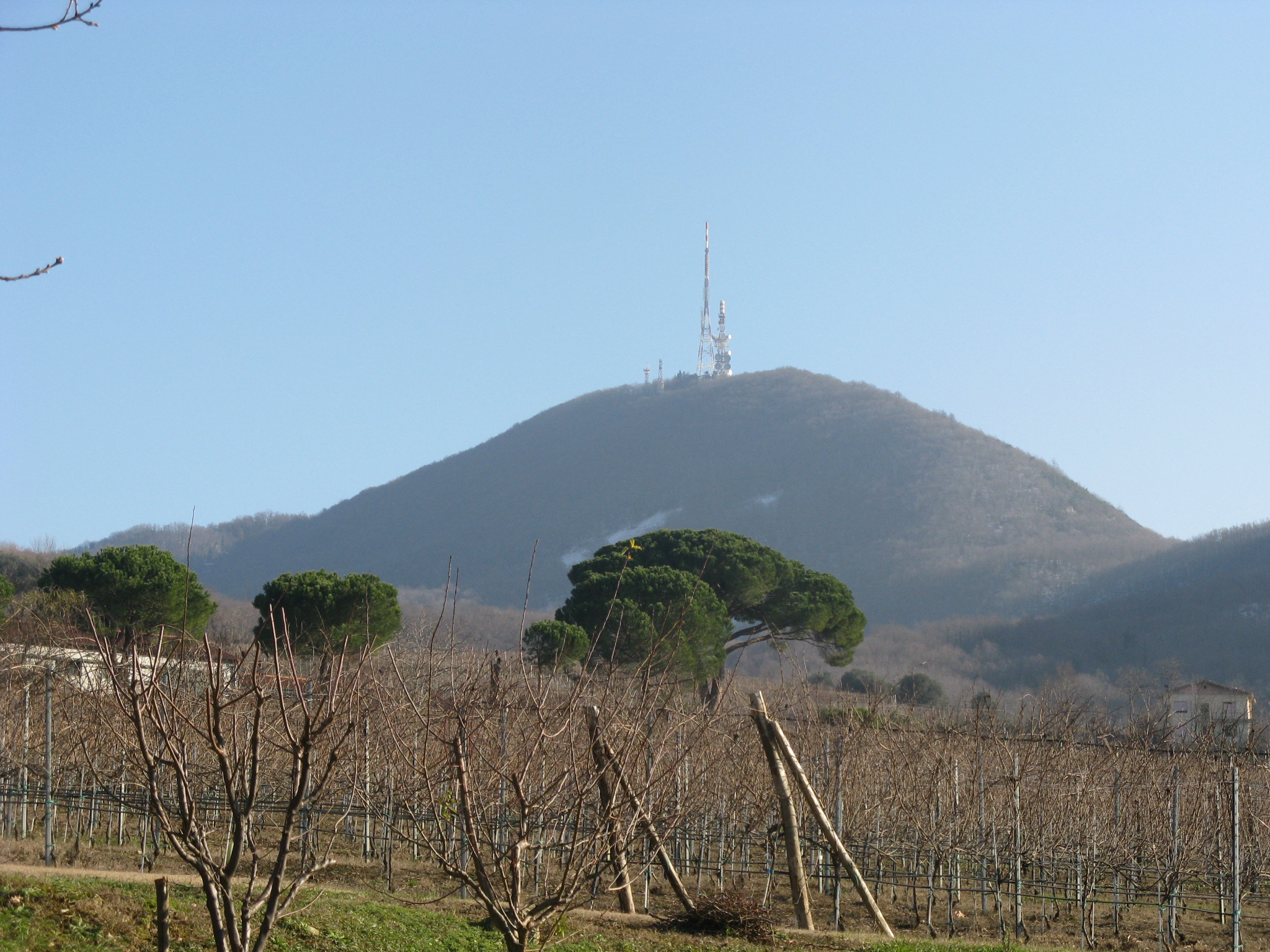

Highest point
- Elevation: 603 m (1,978 ft)
- Coordinates: 45°19′N 11°40′E

Geography
- Location within Alps
- Location: Cinto Euganeo, Galzignano Terme, Vo', Teolo

Monte Venda (lit. Mt. Sell) is the highest mountain in the Euganean Hills of Padua Province, Italy. It has an elevation of 603 m (1,978 ft). Being the only peak of the Euganean Hills to cross the 600 meters threshold, Monte Venda is the only one which can be defined as a mountain rather than a hill.

Monte Venda is located in 4 different municipalities, the summit is divided between Galzignano Terme, Vo', Teolo and Cinto Euganeo
