= Lozzo Atestino =

- Comune
- Comune di Lozzo Atestino
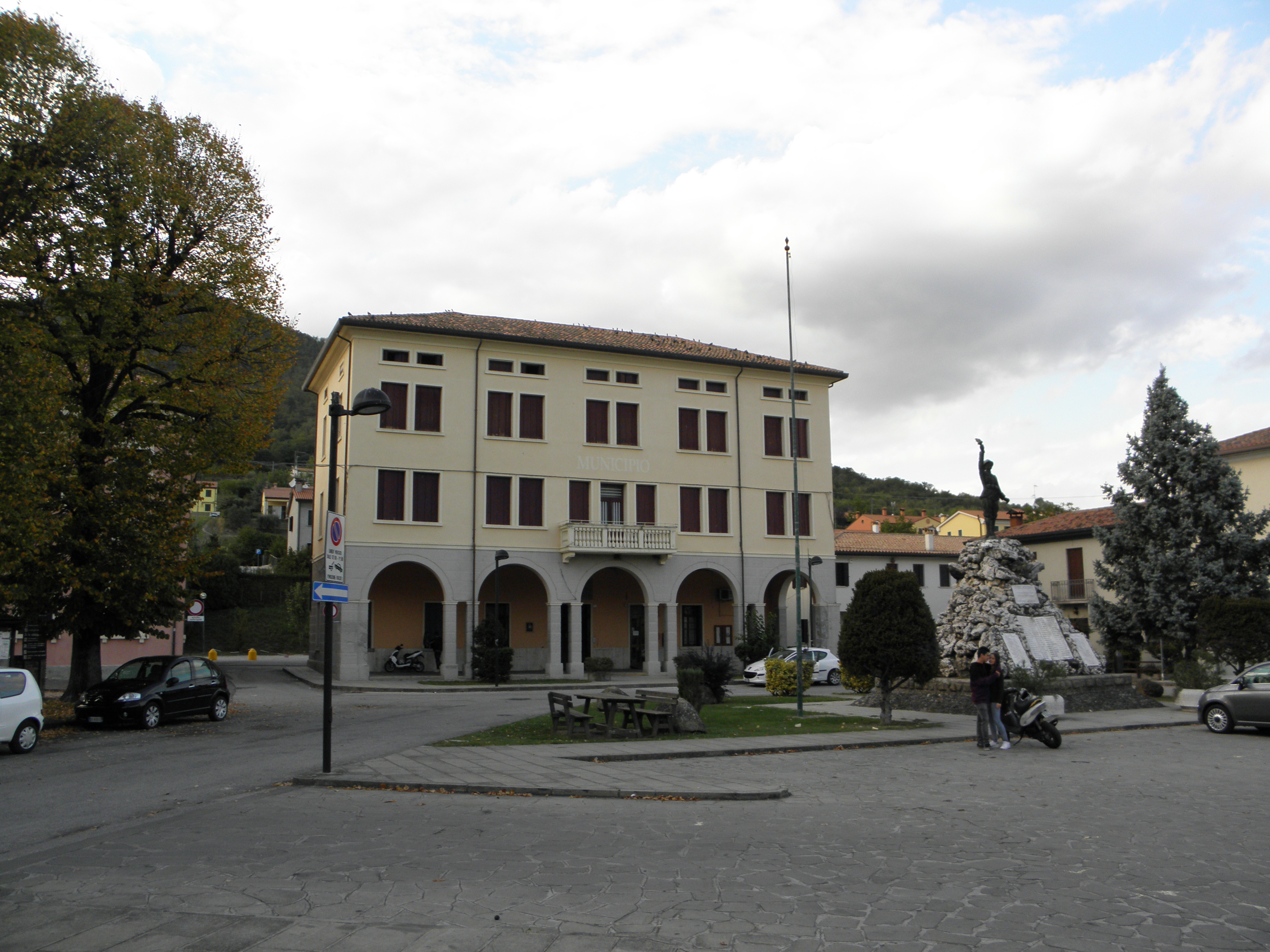
- Town hall.

- Location within Italy Location within Veneto
- Coordinates: 45°17′N 11°38′E
- Country: Italy
- Region: Veneto
- Province: Padua (PD)
- Frazioni: Chiavicone, Lanzetta, Valbona

Government
  - Mayor: Luca Ruffin

Area
  - Total: 24.0 km^{2} (9.3 sq mi)
- Elevation: 19 m (62 ft)

Population (31 August 2021)
  - Total: 2,988
  - Density: 124/km^{2} (322/sq mi)
- Demonym(s): Lutensi, Lozzesi
- Time zone: UTC+1 (CET)
  - Summer (DST): UTC+2 (CEST)
- Postal code: 35034
- Dialing code: 0429
- Patron saint: St. Joseph
- Saint day: March 19
- Website: Official website

Lozzo Atestino is a comune (municipality) in the Province of Padua in the Italian region Veneto, located about 60 kilometres (37 mi) southwest of Venice and about 25 kilometres (16 mi) southwest of Padua, in the Colli Euganei regional park.

Lozzo Atestino borders the following municipalities: Agugliaro, Baone, Cinto Euganeo, Este, Noventa Vicentina, Ospedaletto Euganeo, Vo.

== People ==
- Nevio Scala (football player and coach) was born and still lives in Lozzo Atestino
