= Rousta =

Rousta may refer to:

- Ali Asghar Modir-Rousta, a retired Iranian football striker and now coach
- Homa Rousta, an Iranian film and stage actress

== See also ==
- Rosta (disambiguation)
- Roosta (disambiguation)
- Rustah (disambiguation)
