= Villa Dal Verme =

Historic building in Venice

Coordinates: 45°19′41.1″N 11°34′54.74″E

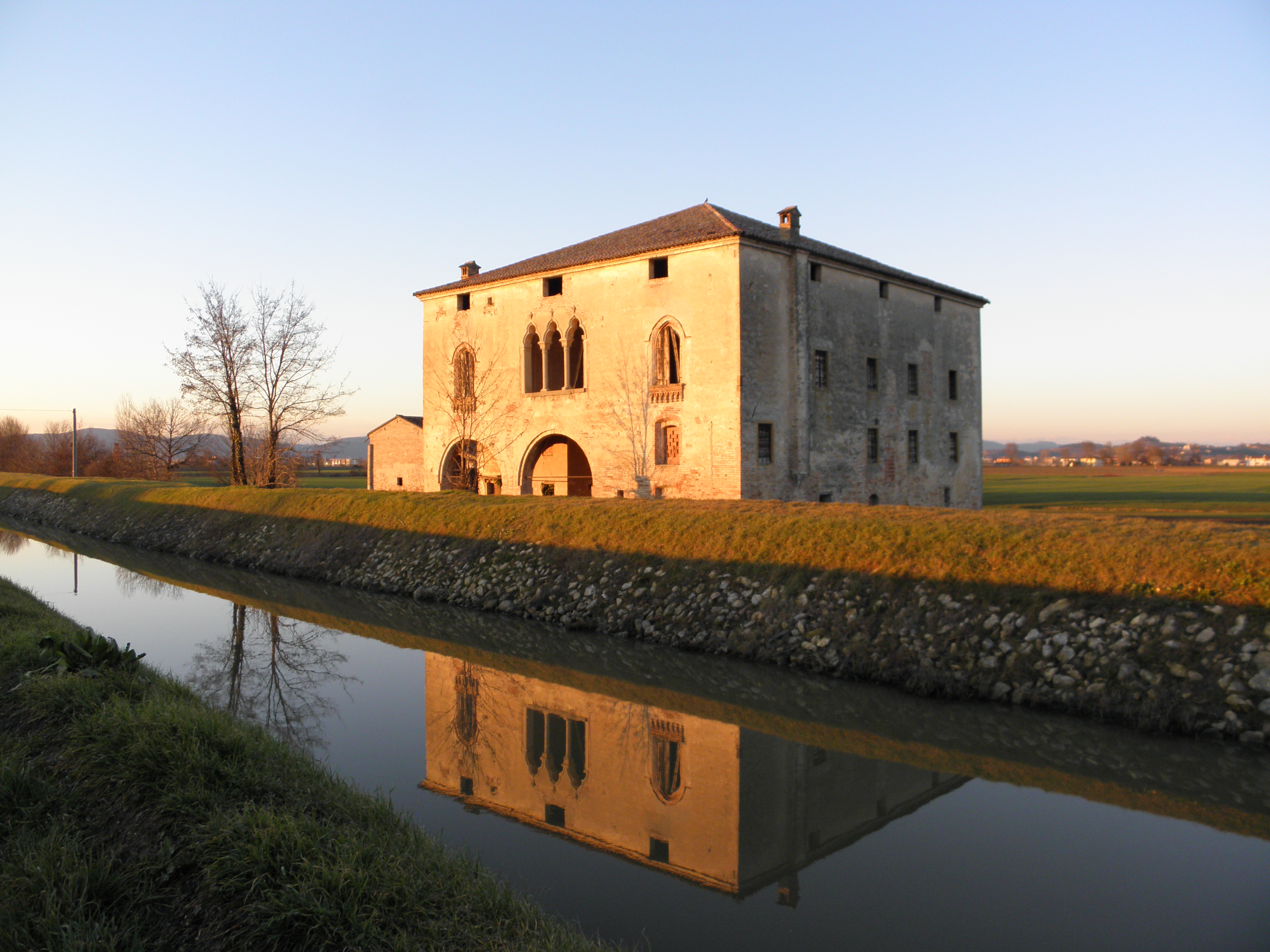
Villa Dal Verme in 2019

Dating to the beginning of the 15th century, Villa Dal Verme is one of the few Venetian villas of that period that has survived until the 21st century without excessive modifications in the exterior. The building is located just outside Agugliaro, not far from the road to Vò on the Liona canal and is sometimes referred to as "the mother of all Venetian villas."

== History ==
The villa was built at the beginning of the 15th century by the wealthy Dal Verme family originally from Verona and then settled in Milan, Piacenza, Bobbio and Voghera. A prominent member of the family was Luchino Dal Verme who, at the head of a mercenary army in the service of the Republic of Venice, had suppressed the insurrection of the Venetian settlers in Crete (1363-1366). His family came to own extensive properties in Verona, as well as in the Lower Vicentino, which they however lost during the battles between Venice and Milan due to the rebellion of the leader Alvise Dal Verme in 1441. The Fracanzani family, which would have taken over the investiture of the County of Agugliaro in 1454, he acquired part of their properties through the intervention of Giovanni Pietro da Costa in 1447.; the list of possessions confiscated from the leader filled 62 sheets. The Pisani family, one of the oldest and most noble families in Venice, also participated in the purchase of goods confiscated from Dal Verme in 1437.

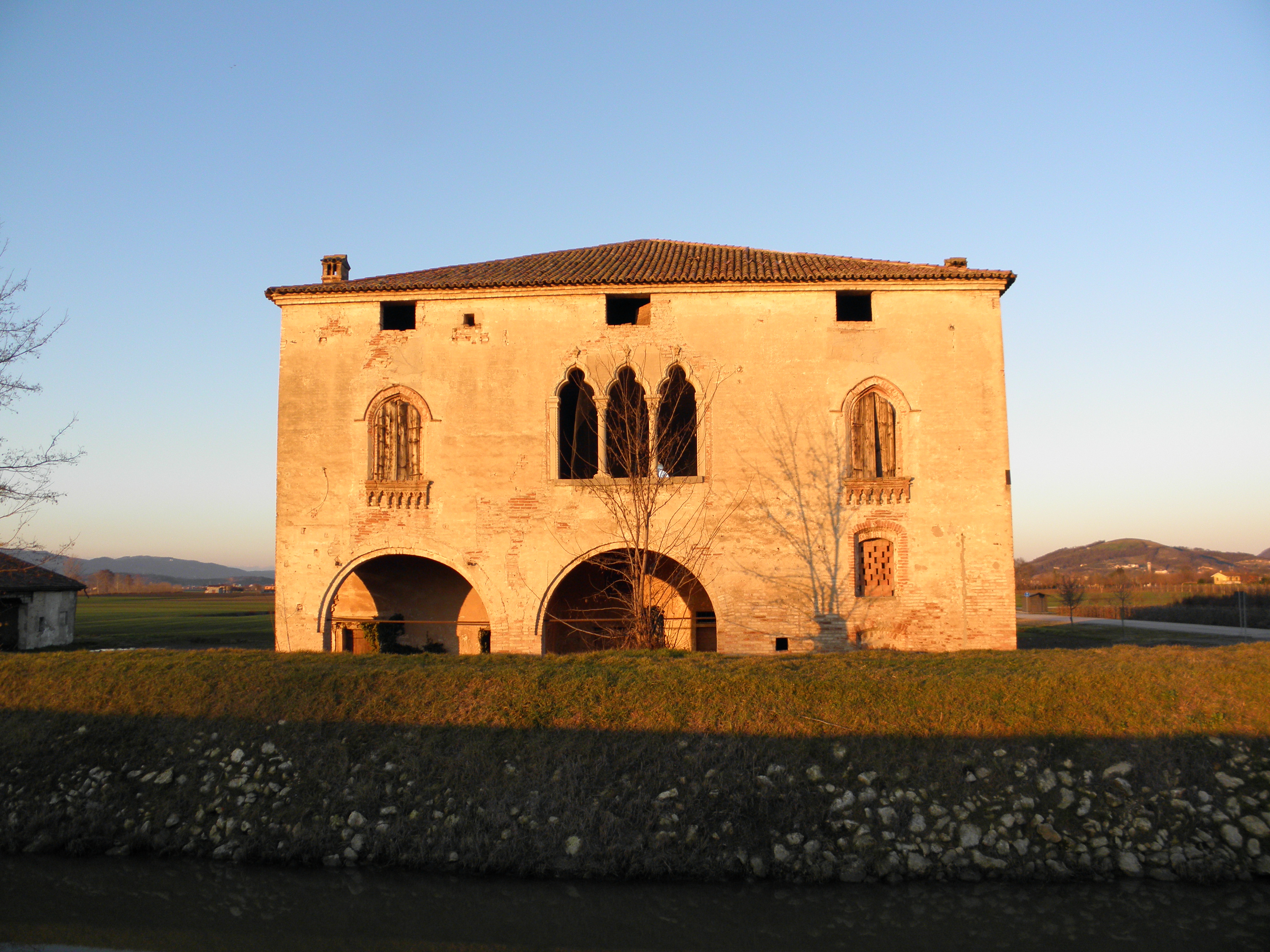
View from across the canal

The cause of the decline of the family was the betrayal of Alvise Dal Verme. After the end of the war with the Holy Roman Empire and then with Milan, in fact, the army was suddenly reduced from 31,000 men to 5,000 cavalry and 2,000 infantry, also driving out the various leaders Venice service. The leader Alvise Dal Verme, on the other hand, refused in 1436 to disband his army and leave it at the service of the Venetians. But only when he switched sides to Milan did Venice, which now considered him a deserter, confiscate his properties and deprived him of his place of honor in the Maggior Consiglio.

The building preceding the villa probably served defensive purposes, but soon became a warehouse (fondaco) becoming a base for trade with Venice, which at the time took place by water.

Other buildings, mentioned in the old land registers and still visible in a 1652 map, have disappeared. They included a long arcade or barchessa on the west side and a low rustic building on the east side.

== Description ==
The villa is unusual for its time, representing the earliest example of Venetian Gothic decoration in the country surrounding Vicenza.

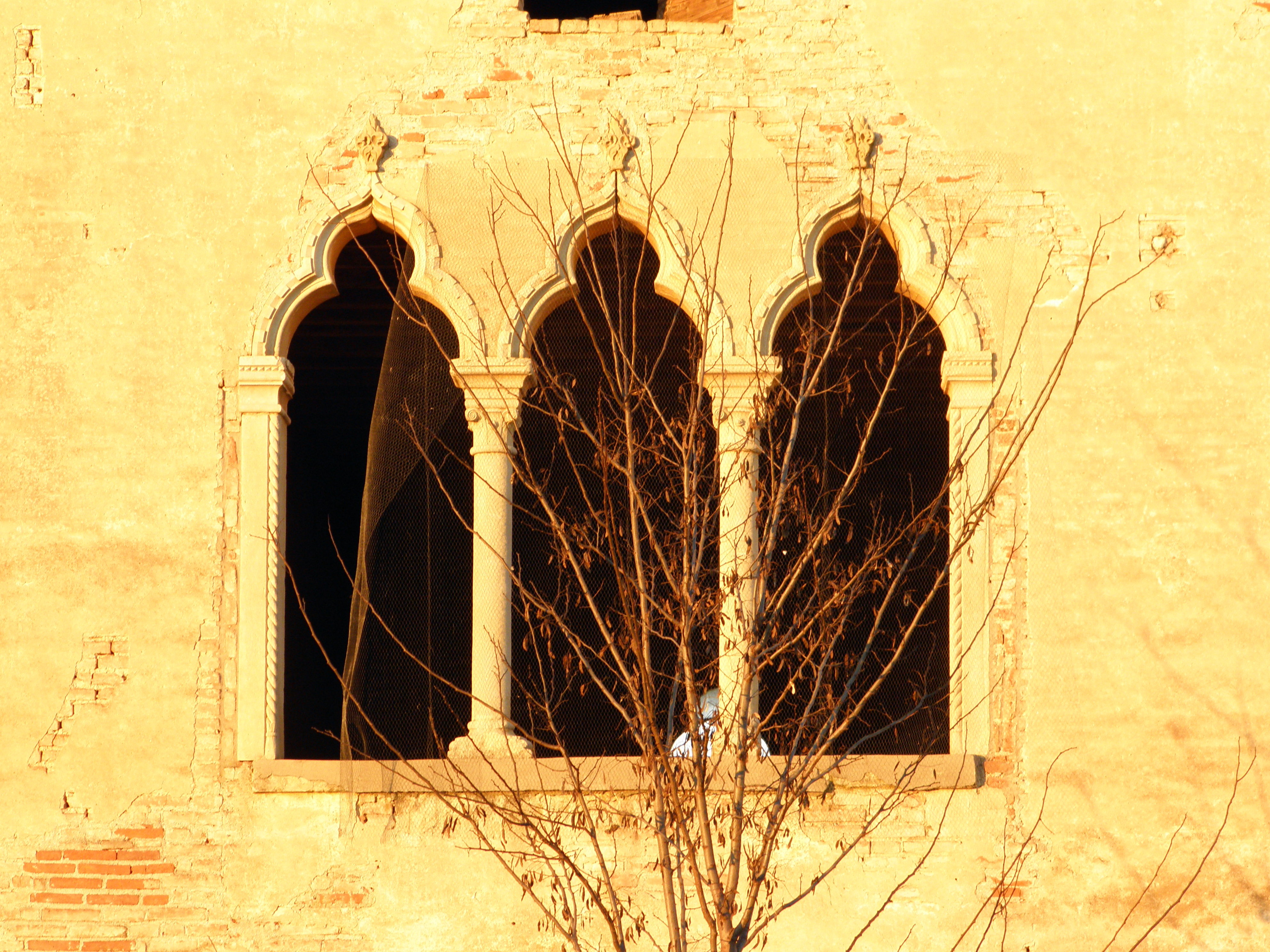
The trifora in soft stone of the Berici.

The building, with a square plan, has the main facade facing south, overlooking the Liona canal, whose banks partially hide the view. The facade is characterized by a portico with two large segmental arches, which occupy the left and central part, while on the right side there are two arched single-lancet windows. On the main floor there is a trifora in soft stone from the Berici, whose arches rest on slender stone columns. On the sides there are two trefoil single-lancet windows in terracotta with a sill with small arches in the center of which is a small coat of arms of the Dal Verme family. The embankment that confines the canal has risen and partly hides the view of this side of the house from the canal.

The north facade is symmetrical to the front one and opens towards the countryside, repeating the scheme of the main facade on the main floor, while a round arch in terracotta opens on the ground floor. On the side facades, the large number of windows and doors with different frames denounce the numerous tampering suffered by the villa over the centuries. Added to this is the almost total loss of the frescoed surfaces and plasters, due to decades of neglect.

In the western facade there was an arch equal to the two in the facade, and now partially closed. This combined with traces in the ground floor walls suggest that the portico originally extended in depth occupying the entire western sector of the villa, and that it was subsequently reduced due to the construction of a new staircase. The interior is devoid of decoration. On the main floor there is a central passageway hall illuminated by the two mullioned windows, while the side rooms are now divided irregularly. Noteworthy are the terracotta doors, the work of Lombard workers, as well as the trilobed single-lancet windows on the façade. The three-mullioned windows, on the other hand, are the work of Venetian stonemasonry masters from the end of the 15th century, placed to replace previous terracotta openings, and therefore attributable to a subsequent restructuring of the complex.

== Bibliography ==
- PDF Donata Battilotti: Ville Venete, La provincia di Vicenza, Istituto Regionale per le ville venete, 2005
- Renato Cevese, Ville della provincia di Vicenza, Rusconi, 1980, p. 249
