= Filippo Mocenigo =

Archbishop of Nicosia from 1560 to 1586

- Archbishop of Nicosia
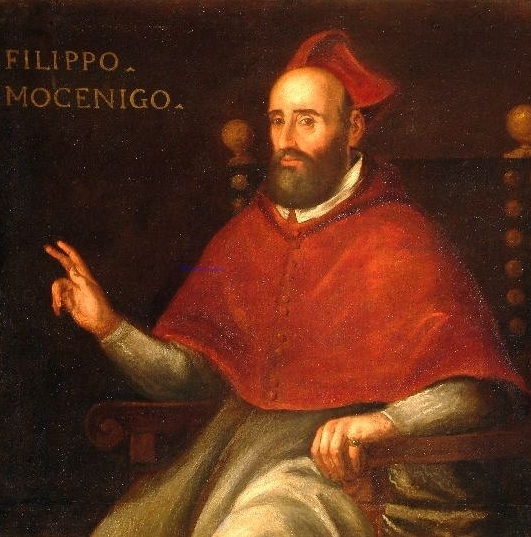
- Church: Catholic Church
- See: Archbishop of Nicosia
- Appointed: 13 March 1560
- Term ended: 1 June 1586

Orders
- Consecration: 1 May 1560 (Bishop) by Gianbernardino Scotti

Personal details
- Born: 11 April 1524 Venice
- Died: 18 June 1586 (aged 62) Hermitage on Monte Rua
- Buried: Hermitage on Monte Rua

Filippo Mocenigo (Latin: Philippus Mocenius, 1524–1586) was Latin Archbishop of Nicosia from 1560 to 1586 and a philosopher.

== Early life ==
Filippo Mocenigo was born on 11 April 1524 in Venice in the noble Mocenigo family. His father, Pietro, belonged to the San Samuele branch of the family, his uncle Tommaso was Procurator of Saint Mark (the second office in Venice after the doge), and his cousin, Alvise, was Ambassador of Venice at Rome and later doge from 1570 to 1577. Filippo's mother was Chiara of the noble House of Contarini. Filippo studied philosophy at the University of Padua and he took up a career in the administration of the Republic of Venice: Savio agli Ordini in 1552, extraordinary ambassador in Poland the year after, Magistrato alle pompe in 1554 and ambassador in Savoy in 1559.

== Archbishop of Nicosia ==
Still a layman, he was proposed by the government of the Republic of Venice as Latin Archbishop of Nicosia, capital of the island of Cyprus. The appointment by Pope Pius IV followed on 13 March 1560, He received the pallium on 26 April and he was consecrated bishop in Rome on 1 May 1560 by Cardinal Gianbernardino Scotti.

Cyprus was a Venetian possession since 1473, and two different ecclesiastical hierarchies were present: the Latin, with three bishoprics under the episcopal see of Nicosia: Famagusta, Limassol and Paphos, and the Greek Orthodox, four bishops formally subordinated to the Latin Archbishop of Nicosia and followed by most of the population. The Latin bishops usually did not resided in Cyprus, and this helped the pacific coexistence of the two different hierarchies. Filippo left Italy for Cyprus on 10 August 1560 and entered in Nicosia on 17 September along many followers, including two Jesuits. His first target in Cyprus was to raise the instruction of the youngs teaching them a correct Latin doctrine.

In 1561 Filippo returned in Italy to participate to the last period of the Council of Trent, where he entered on 9 September 1562. At the council Filippo spoke in favour of the obligation of bishops to reside in their diocese as a divine commandment, and against bishops having plurality of benefices. After the end of the council, Filippo went to Rome where he collaborated with the Holy Office, and where on 19 May 1564 he was also appointed as General Commissioner of the Inquisition in Cyprus. He was again in Cyprus on 21 September 1564.

In Cyprus Filippo Mocenigo, who however was respectful about the Orthodox rite and practices, planned to reestablish the subordination of the Orthodox bishops to the Latin ones, and to eliminate the corruption that was widespread both among the Orthodox and Latin hierarchies. This last goal put him at odds with the local Venetian government who had a good relationship with the Orthodox clergy. On 21 April 1566 the Council of Ten, to keep harmony with the local population, ordered him to maintain the existing ecclesiastical order, to postpone the publication of the decrees of the Council of Trent in the Orthodox rite churches and not to inform the Roman Curia of the disputes with the local Orthodox clergy. Filippo agreed to postpone the publication of the decrees of the Council of Trent, but he remained determined to pursue the other objectives. On 16 January 1567 he convened a synod in the cathedral of Nicosia where participated all leaders of all Christian rites present in the island. In that synod, Filippo tried to establish a committee of six people in charge of examining the candidates for all ecclesiastical appointments, but the Greek bishop of Solià, Neofitus Logaràs, who ruled over the Orthodox population of Nicosia, fiercely opposed and the two bishops argued heavily in public. As a result of this dispute, Filippo sent Logaras to trial before the Roman Curia, but the Venetian government brought the trial before the Council of Ten, which in February 1568 admonished Logaras but gave him 200 ducats as an act of friendship. The Pope learned of the affair, and protested harshly towards Venice. To ensure that Filippo Mocenigo was more loyal to the Republic of Venice than to the Pope, Filippo was summoned to Venice before the Senate and the Doge, where he arrived in May 1568. Filippo never returned to Cyprus.

In 1570, a full-scale Ottoman assault brought the island under Ottoman control. Ottoman forces capturing Cyprus massacred many Greek and Armenian Christian inhabitants. On 1 July 1570, Nicosia came under the rule of the Ottomans, and the previous Latin elite were destroyed. Filippo Mocenigo, who was in Italy during this war, lost his archbishopric as well as most of his incomes but saved his life.

== Last years and his trials ==
Filippo Mocenigo, left without a diocese, settled in Padua where he devoted to philosophy. The period was also troubled by economic problems, and by a quarrel with his brother Marcantonio. Already in 1572 he asked Pope Gregory XIII and Charles Borromeo to obtain some new ecclesiastical office. The office he was aiming for was to be appointed as coadjutor to the Patriarch of Aquileia, Giovanni Grimani, with the right of succession. Supported by the Venetian government (his cousin was the doge) and by Cardinal Commendone he moved to Rome in October 1573.

The process of his appointment as coadjutor of Aquileia was blocked by the discovery of a complaint against him, more than ten years earlier, by the inquisitor of Pera with whom Filippo had traveled to Trento. Filippo was accused of possessing a forbidden book, the Ptolomey’s Geography commented by the Lutheran Sebastian Münster, and of having verbally supported the need to reopen in the council the discussion on the relationship between faith and works, a central point in the debate with the Protestants. Thanks to the Venetian ambassador in Rome, Paolo Tiepolo, Filippo managed to avoid a formal trial before the Inquisition, but he had to renounce every new episcopal appointment, since a suspicion of heresy was enough to make one unfit for the care of souls. Filippo remained in Rome as Assistant to the papal throne.

He obtained by Pope Gregory XIII to have a formal process in order to clear his situation. The process opened on 8 June 1583 in front of the Inquisitor Cardinal Santorio. The trial revolved around a short treatise in Italian written by Filippo a few years earlier, and never published, entitled Vie et progressi spirituali (Ways and spiritual progresses), considered too spiritual. The sentence, issued on 6 October 1583, acquitted Filippo but ordered that all manuscript copies of this treaty be destroyed.

At the end of March 1586 Filippo Mocenigo was still in Rome. Then he moved to the camaldolese hermitage located on Monte Rua not far from Padua, where he died on 18 June 1586, as indicated in his gravestone once present in the local chapel of Santa Maria Assunta.

== Works ==
Filippo Mocenigo published in 1581 in Venice a prominent treatise of Aristotelian philosophy, Universales institutiones ad hominum perfectionem quatenus industria parari potest, written with the intent of educating young people to defend the Catholic religion, with particular reference to the young people attending the German, English, Hungarian, Greek and Maronite colleges of Rome. Filippo was highly regarded by contemporaries as philosopher, and he was considered one of the major living philosophers by Paolo Paruta in its Dialogo della perfettione della vita politica.
