= Claudio Ridolfi =

Italian painter (1560–1644)

- Born: 1560; Verona
- Died: 1644 (aged 83–84); Ancona
- Known for: Painting
- Movement: Baroque

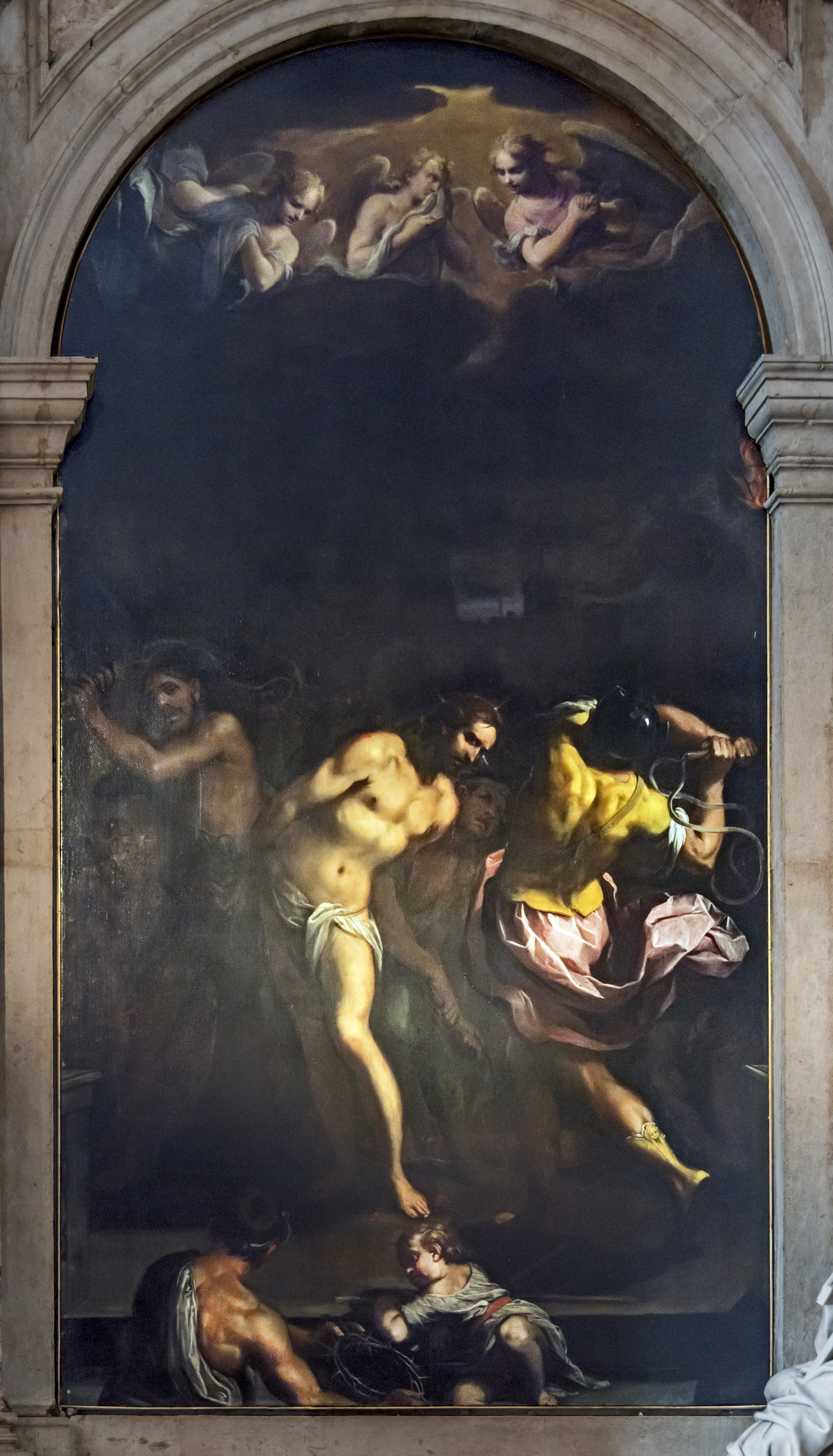
Flogging - Sant'Anastasia (Verona)

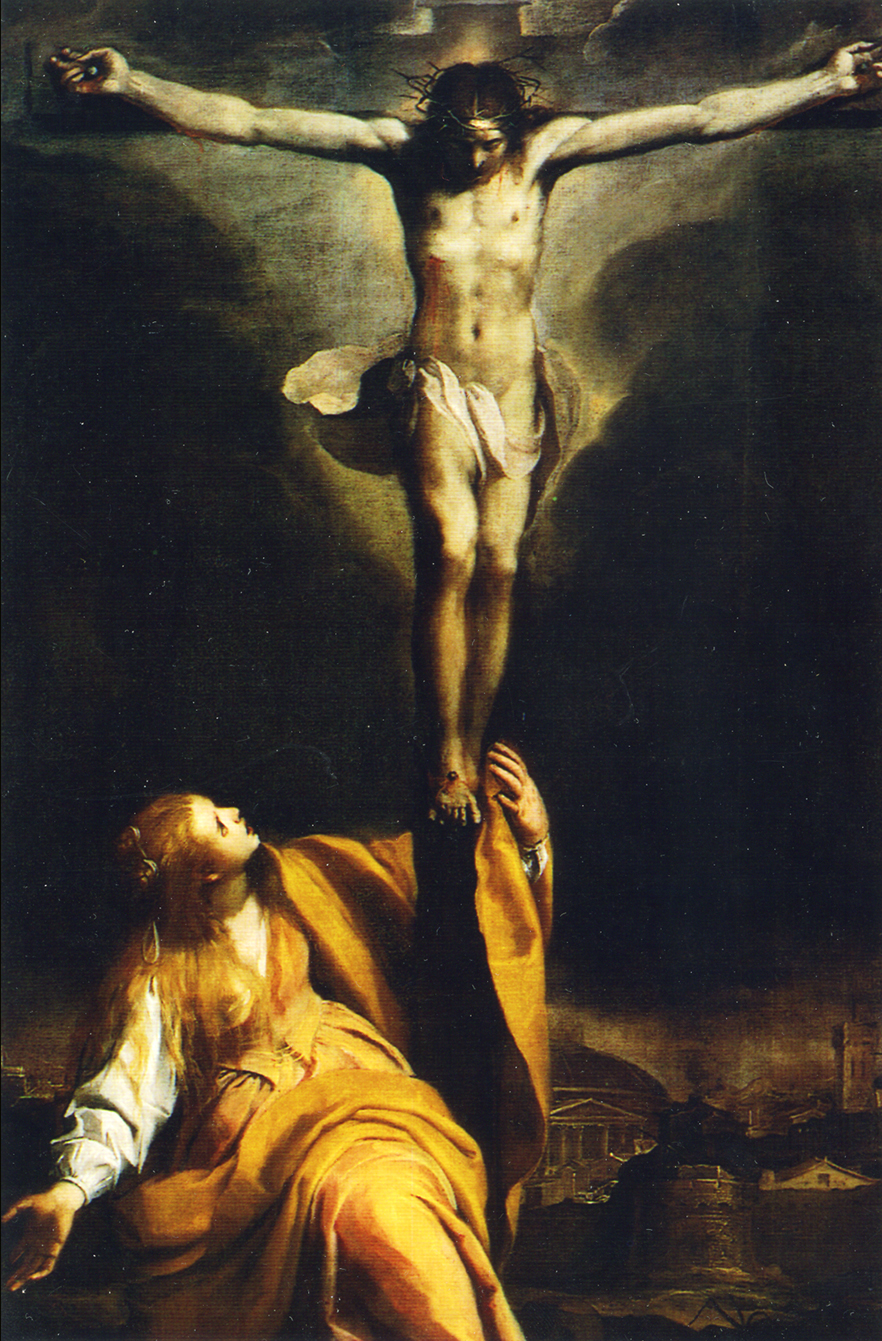
Mary Magdalene at the foot of the Cross. Santa Maria in Portuno, Corinaldo

Claudio Ridolfi (1560–1644), also known as Claudio Veronese, was an Italian painter of the Renaissance period.

== Biography ==
Ridolfi was born in Verona to a noble family. He was active mainly in Rome and Urbino where he was a pupil of the painters Dario Pozzo and Paolo Veronese. Simone Cantarini, Girolamo Cialdieri, Benedetto Marini, and two painters named Patanazzi and Urbinelli were pupils or followers of Ridolfi.

Despite being unable to find employment as a painter, he lived a comfortable life and enjoyed painting. While in Urbino he married a noblewoman and established himself in Corinaldo. He died in 1644 aged 84 years old.

== Works ==
- Birth of John the Baptist for the church of Santa Lucia in Urbino
- Presentation of the virgin in the temple for a church in Santo Spirito
- Deposition for a church in Rimini
- Santa Giustina, St Benedict presenting rules to the principal Benedictines for a church in Padua
- San Fillippo and Santa Maria Assunta, in a canvas, in the church of Santa Maria Assunta, in Galzignano Terme
