= Baone =

- Comune
- Comune di Baone
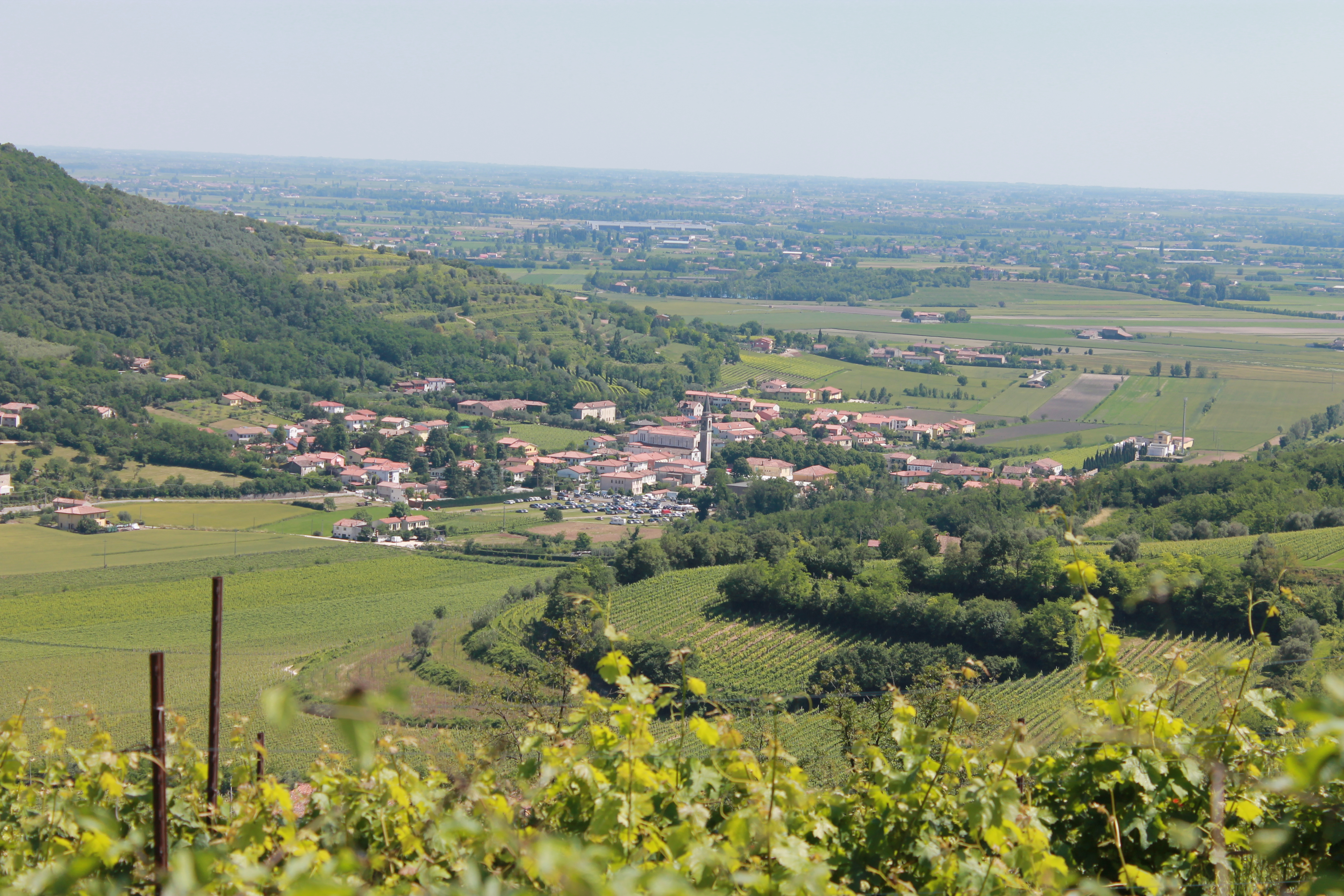

- Location within Italy Location within Veneto
- Coordinates: 45°15′N 11°41′E
- Country: Italy
- Region: Veneto
- Province: Padua (PD)
- Frazioni: Calaone, Rivadolmo, Valle San Giorgio

Government
  - Mayor: Francesco Corso

Area
  - Total: 24.42 km^{2} (9.43 sq mi)
- Elevation: 17 m (56 ft)

Population (31 August 2021)
  - Total: 3,093
  - Density: 126.7/km^{2} (328.0/sq mi)
- Demonym: Baonensi
- Time zone: UTC+1 (CET)
  - Summer (DST): UTC+2 (CEST)
- Postal code: 35030
- Dialing code: 0429
- Website: Official website

Baone is a comune (municipality) in the Province of Padua in the Italian region Veneto, located about 50 kilometres (31 mi) southwest of Venice and about 25 kilometres (16 mi) southwest of Padua.

Baone borders the following municipalities: Arquà Petrarca, Cinto Euganeo, Este, Galzignano Terme, Lozzo Atestino, Monselice.
