= Santa Maria Assunta, Galzignano Terme =

Roman Catholic church in Italy

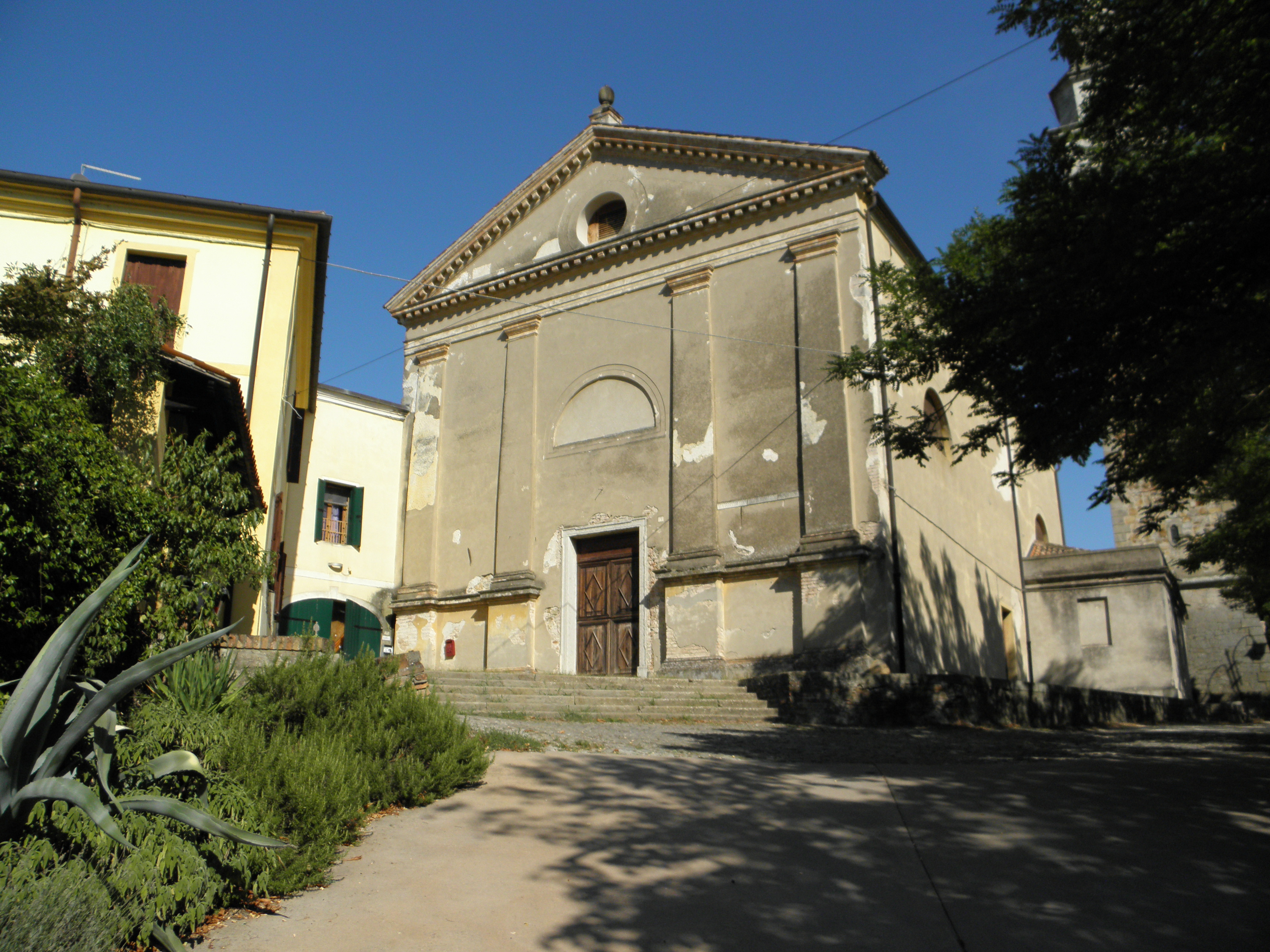

Santa Maria Assunta is a Roman Catholic parish church in the comune of Galzignano Terme, province of Padova, region of Veneto, Italy.

== History ==
The first parish church, dedicated to the Holy Trinity, was built in the 11th century. This church was destroyed in 1337 by Riccobona Carrarese, when he patronized the Franciscan monastery of Sant'Antonio. A chapel or oratory likely existed at the site of Santa Maria Assunta, and with growth of population, it became parish church, while St Eusebius became chapel. The present layout of the church is owed to a 1674 reconstruction, and refurbished in a neoclassical-style in the mid-19th century. The bell tower was completed in 1905. The main altar (1676) houses an altarpiece depicting the Assumption of the Madonna above St Valentine and Phillip Neri by Claudio Ridolfi.
