= Dario Pozzo =

Italian painter

Dario Pozzo (Verona, 1592–1652) was an Italian painter of the late-Renaissance in Verona. His output was light, and he is claimed to have been a teacher of the elder painter Claudio Ridolfi.

== Biography ==
Pozzo was born the illegitimate son of Paolo, son of Giovanni Battista de' Nobili dal Pozzo, originally from San Vitale of Verona. Pozzo married Isabella Varotari, a wealthy noblewoman from Padua. He was described as active and spirited, able to sing and play various musical instruments. Among his works are an Annunciation (1628) for the Chapel of the Rosary in the church of Sant'Anastasia and a St Filippo Neri for the church of San Francesco di Paola, both churches in Verona.
