= Roosta =

Roosta may refer to:

- Roosta, character of The Hitchhiker's Guide to the Galaxy
- Roosta, name of a district in Isfahan area in Iran
- Ali Asghar Modir Roosta, retired Iranian football striker and now coach

== See also ==
- Rosta (disambiguation)
- Rousta (disambiguation)
- Rusta (disambiguation)
