= Rustah =

Rustah may refer to:

- Rustah, name of a district in Isfahan area in Iran
- Ahmad ibn Rustah, a tenth-century Persian explorer and geographer

== See also ==
- Roosta (disambiguation)
- Rusta (disambiguation)
