= Vo' =

- Comune
- Comune di Vo'
- Location within Italy Location within Veneto
- Coordinates: 45°20′N 11°38′E
- Country: Italy
- Region: Veneto
- Province: Province of Padua (PD)

Area
  - Total: 20.4 km^{2} (7.9 sq mi)

Population (Dec. 2004)
  - Total: 3,416
  - Density: 167/km^{2} (434/sq mi)
- Time zone: UTC+1 (CET)
  - Summer (DST): UTC+2 (CEST)
- Postal code: 35030
- Dialing code: 049

Vo' (or Vo' Euganeo; sometimes incorrectly spelled Vò or Vò Euganeo) is a comune (municipality) in the Province of Padua in the Italian Veneto region, located about 50 kilometres (31 mi) west of Venice and about 20 kilometres (12 mi) southwest of Padua, in the western end of the Euganean Hills. Mount Venda forms part of its territory, at 603 metres (1,978 ft) the highest of the Hills area. Along with the three other Italian towns Ne, Re, and Ro, Vo' shares the distinction of having the shortest town name in Italy. As of 31 December 2004, it had a population of 3,416 and an area of 20.4 square kilometres (7.9 mi^{2}).

Vo' borders the following municipalities: Agugliaro, Albettone, Cinto Euganeo, Galzignano Terme, Lozzo Atestino, Rovolon, Teolo.

Vo' was an early hotspot in the COVID-19 pandemic in Europe, and valuable lessons were learned in the successful management of Vo''s epidemic.

== History ==
Vo' takes its name from the Latin Vadum, probably the ancient commercial port on the Adige River, which until 589 forked near Monte Este, and its secondary branch ran alongside the Euganean Hills, skirting Monte della Madonna. During the medieval period, two castles went up: one belonging to the noble Da Vo' family and another at Castellaro belonging to the Maltraversi family. Between the 16th and 17th centuries noted Venetian families (including the Contarini and the Veniers) built a number of villas in the area, and at this same time the old center, Vo' Vecchio, was founded, seat of the comune until 1900. In 1900 a new municipal "capital" was set up at Vo' Centro, known also as Ca' Erizzo; in 1933 the name Vo' was made definitive. One of its most famous villas is the Ca' Morosini. The villa, which goes back to at least 1300 and was once a Benedictine hermitage, has belonged to the Zavattiero family since 1930.

== COVID-19 pandemic ==
Vo' became the center of the COVID-19 pandemic in Veneto when two people were found positive on 21 February 2020. The next day, one of them, a 78-year-old man, died, the first COVID-19 death in the country. The number of infections had also risen to 29. On 24 February an "iron-clad sanitary cordon" was created around the town and a testing program for all of its residents initiated. As of 29 February, 3% of the population was found to test positive, most of them asymptomatic. People with positive tests were placed in isolation.

By March 23, the spread of the disease had been stopped and no new cases could be identified. It was concluded that mass testing of people with no symptoms in conjunction with isolation of infected persons was critical to control the spread of the COVID-19 pandemic in Vo'.

== Demographic evolution ==
Historical population

Year	Pop.	±%
1861	?	—
1871	2,655	—
1881	2,968	+11.8%
1901	3,378	+13.8%
1911	3,793	+12.3%

Year	Pop.	±%
1921	4,084	+7.7%
1931	4,019	−1.6%
1936	4,120	+2.5%
1951	4,312	+4.7%
1961	3,735	−13.4%

Year	Pop.	±%
1971	3,677	−1.6%
1981	3,655	−0.6%
1991	3,399	−7.0%
2001	3,432	+1.0%

Source: Data from ISTAT
