= Arquà Petrarca =

Arquà
- Comune
- Comune di Arquà
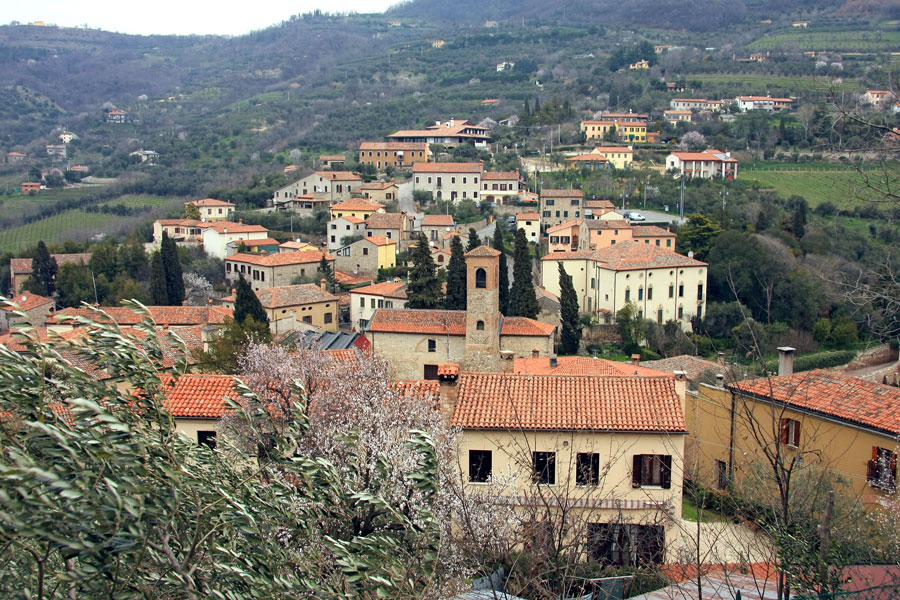

- The position of Arquà Petrarca within the province of Padua.

- Location within Italy Location within Veneto
- Coordinates: 45°16′12″N 11°43′06″E
- Country: Italy
- Region: Veneto
- Province: Padua (PD)

Government
  - Mayor: Luca Callegaro

Area
  - Total: 12.52 km^{2} (4.83 sq mi)

Population (2001)
  - Total: 1,876
  - Density: 149.8/km^{2} (388.1/sq mi)
- Time zone: UTC+1 (CET)
  - Summer (DST): UTC+2 (CEST)
- Postal code: 35032
- Dialing code: 0429
- Patron saint: Holy Trinity
- Saint day: The first Sunday after Whitsunday
- Website: Official website

Arquà Petrarca (Italian pronunciation: [arˈkwa ppeˈtrarka]) is a town and municipality (comune) in northeastern Italy, in the Veneto region, in the province of Padua. As of 2007 the estimated population of Arquà Petrarca was 1,835. It is one of I Borghi più belli d'Italia ("The most beautiful villages of Italy"), and it has been awarded the Bandiera arancione award for excellence in tourism, hospitality and the environment.

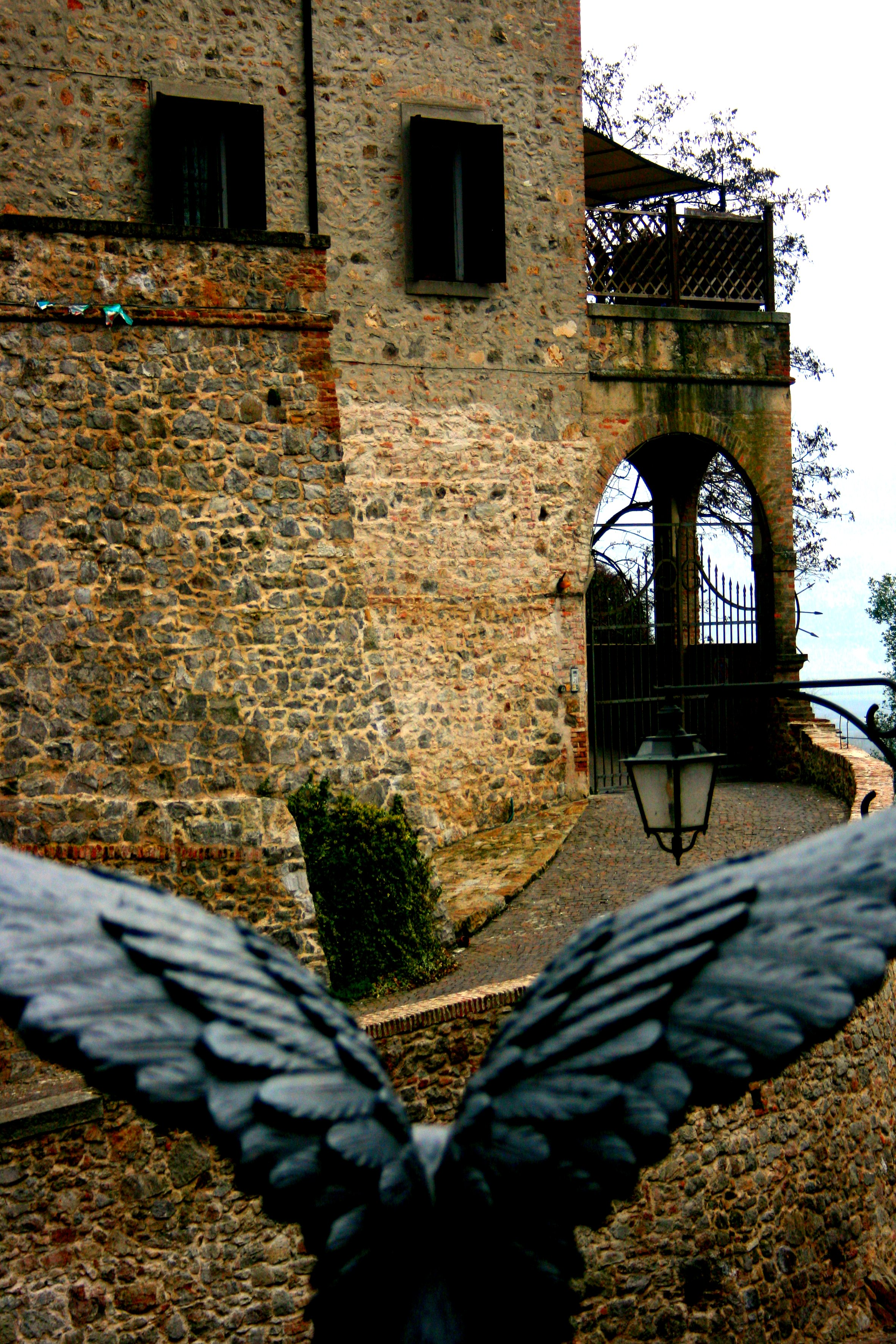
The rear entrance of St. Mary's Church.

Within the town boundaries lies the Coast Lake (Laghetto della Costa), one of the Prehistoric Pile Dwellings Around the Alps, since 2011 in the UNESCO World Heritage Sites list.

== Petrarch ==
Arquà is the place where the poet Petrarch (Francesco Petrarca) lived the final four years of his life (1370–74). In 1870, the town of Arquà added his name to its own. The house where he lived is now a museum dedicated to the poet. The German international literary Petrarca-Preis awards were held in his residence in 1976 and 1977. In 2004, the 700th anniversary of the poet's birth was celebrated here and in nearby Padua.

== History ==
Human presence in Arquà dates back to the Bronze Age, according to archaeological excavations made between the second half of the 19th century and the first decades of the 20th century. Afterwards, the territory was inhabited by the Eneti, and then annexed to the X Regio Venetia et Histria during the age of Augustus.

The legacy of the Roman domination is still present in toponyms (Bignago derives from Bennius, Mercurana from Mercurius) and archeological evidence, such as grave goods, imperial coins and sewage lines.

The village was probably established within a defensive line existing during the Barbaric age, connecting the Rocca of Monselice, a city at the center of the local political and administrative Longobard jurisdiction, with Valle San Giorgio, Cinto Euganeo and the plains at the east of the Euganean Hills.

In the Middle Ages, a castle (castrum) was built on a height, inhabited by Rodolfo Normanno, as certified by a document produced in 985 A.D. The original village developed around this fortified height, called Monte Castello (Castle's hill), with two distinct nuclei growing near the two churches of St Mary and the Holy Trinity.

At the edge of the current Arquà's boundaries, archaeologists found a necropolis attributed to the Euganeans, a population living in the area before the colonization of Rome.

== Origin of the name ==
The name of Arquà derives from Latin Arquatum or Arquata ("Arched"), which was modified during the period of the Republic of Venice to Arquada and finally Arquà. In 1868, after Veneto was annexed to the Kingdom of Italy, the name was changed to Arquà Petrarca in homage to the poet who spent there the last years of his life.

== Tourism ==
Still today, the town preserves a medieval aspect, and it is set in a picturesque location on the slopes of Monte Ventolone and Monte Castello, within the Euganean Hills. Arquà features two city squares: Piazza Petrarca (Petrarch Square) and Piazza San Marco (St. Mark's Square). Near St. Mark's Square stands the Vicars' Lodge, a public space built in the 14th century for heads of families to discuss with the Vicar. In 2003, the roof was rebuilt with a structure of glass and copper, after being demolished in 1828. Being a small village, a complete tour of the main historical sites requires only a few hours.

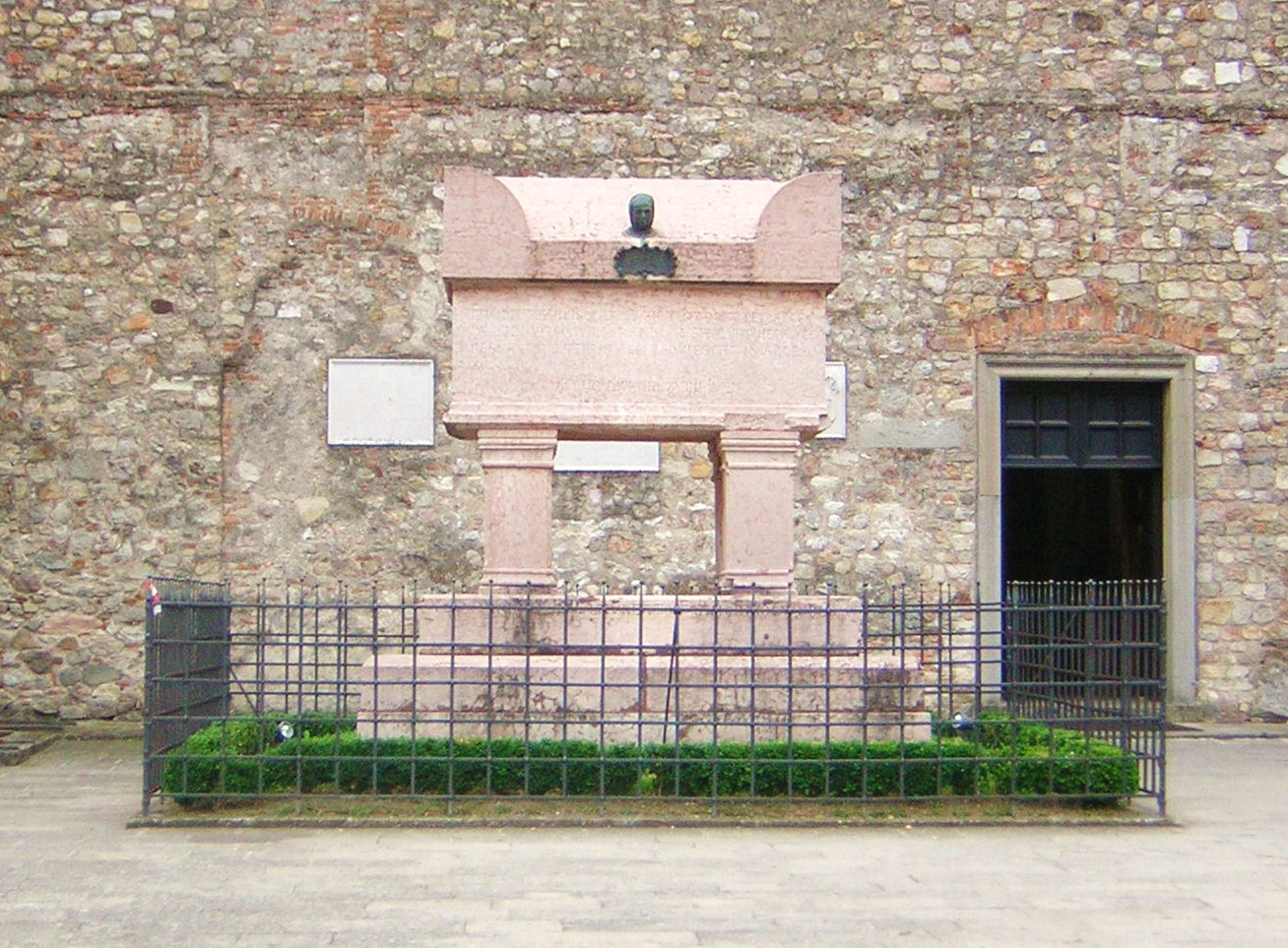
Petrarch's tomb in Petrarch's square, erected by Francescuolo da Bassano, Petrarch's son-in-law. The structure was modeled after Antenor's grave, located nearby in Padua.

Agriculture is commonly practiced in Arquà: local produce includes olives, extra virgin olive oil, honey, chestnuts, and ziziphus (the town is famous for its brodo di giuggiole, or jujube broth).
