= San Lorenzo di Valsanzibio =

Roman Catholic parish church in Italy

Coordinates: 45°17′37″N 11°43′23″E

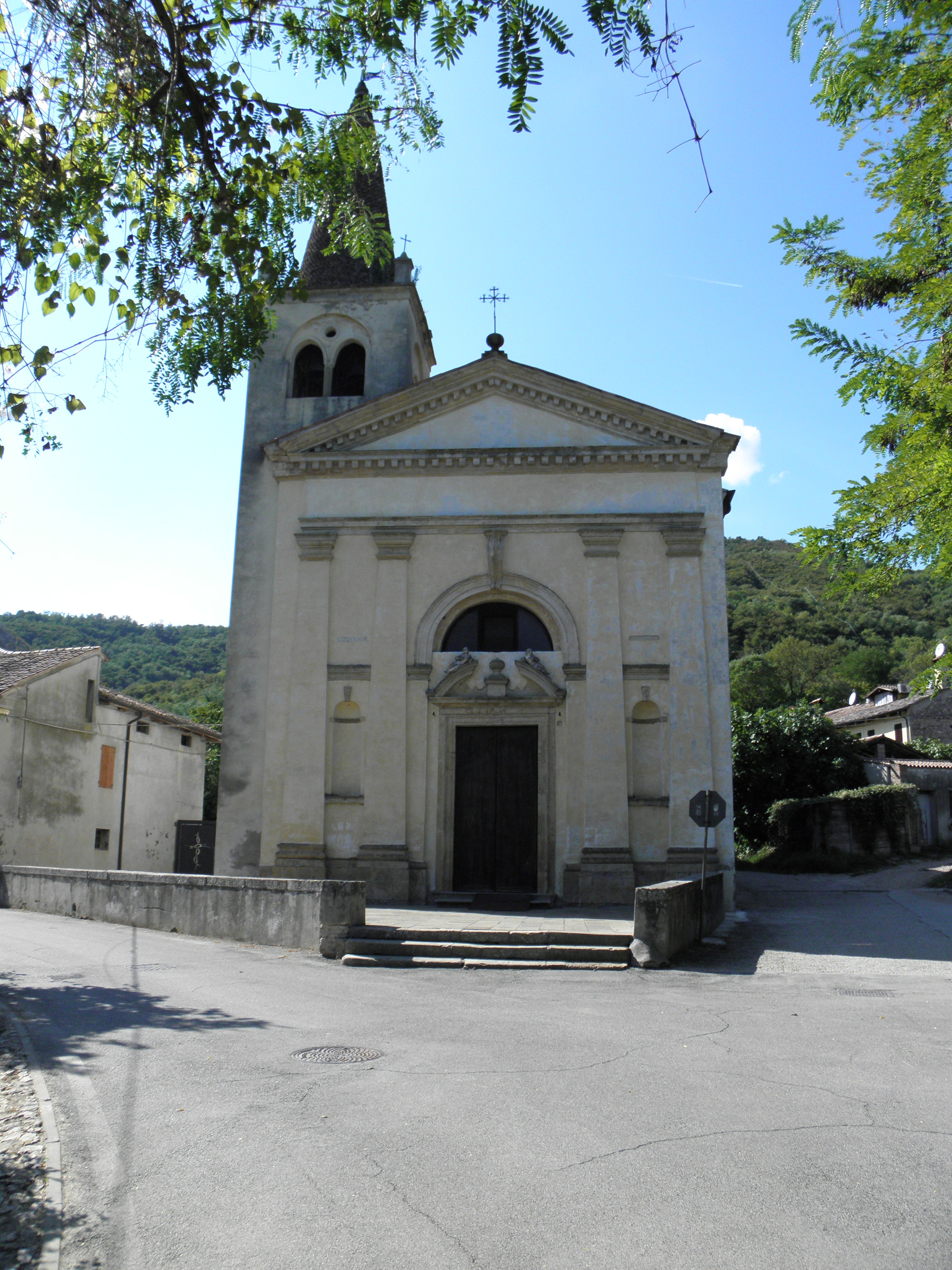

San Lorenzo di Valsanzibio is a Roman Catholic parish church in the frazione of Valsanzibio of the comune of Galzignano Terme, province of Padova, region of Veneto, Italy.

== History ==
The first parish church in Valsanzibio was an ancient church dedicated to St Eusebius, former bishop of Vercelli. Since the pope fought Arian heresy, it is remarkable for a church of this name in former Lombard territory, a tribe known for Arianism.

In the 17th-century, under venetian rule, the church was reconstructed. In 1687 under a procurator Barbarigo, the entire church was begun to be rebuilt in an opposite orientation. A neoclassic façade was added. The church in 2016 is deconsecrated and under restoration.
