= Rosta, Republic of Dagestan =

Rosta Роста РостӀа
- Selo
- Location within Republic of Dagestan Location within Russia
- Coordinates: 42°12′N 46°23′E
- Country: Russia
- Region: Republic of Dagestan
- District: Tlyaratinsky District
- Time zone: UTC+3:00

Rosta (Russian: Роста; Avar: РостӀа) is a rural locality (a selo) in Mazadinsky Selsoviet, Tlyaratinsky District, Republic of Dagestan, Russia. Population: 77 (2010 census); 46 (2002 census); 128 (1989 Soviet census).

== Geography ==
Rosta is located 29 km north of Tlyarata (the district's administrative centre) by road. Niklida and Mazada are the nearest rural localities.
