= Rosta =

Rosta may refer to:

- Rosta, Iran, a historical district in Isfahan area in Iran
- Rosta, Piedmont, a comune in the province of Turin, Piedmont, Italy
  - Rosta railway station
- Rosta, Republic of Dagestan, a rural locality in Russia
- Rosta, Örebro, Sweden, a district in the Million Programme
- Rosta (river), a river in Murmansk Oblast, Russia
- ROSTA, Russian Telegraph Agency, the first Soviet news agency

== See also ==
- Rasta (disambiguation)
- Roosta (disambiguation)
- Roster (disambiguation)
