= Monte Cinto (Colli Euganei) =

Mountain in Italy

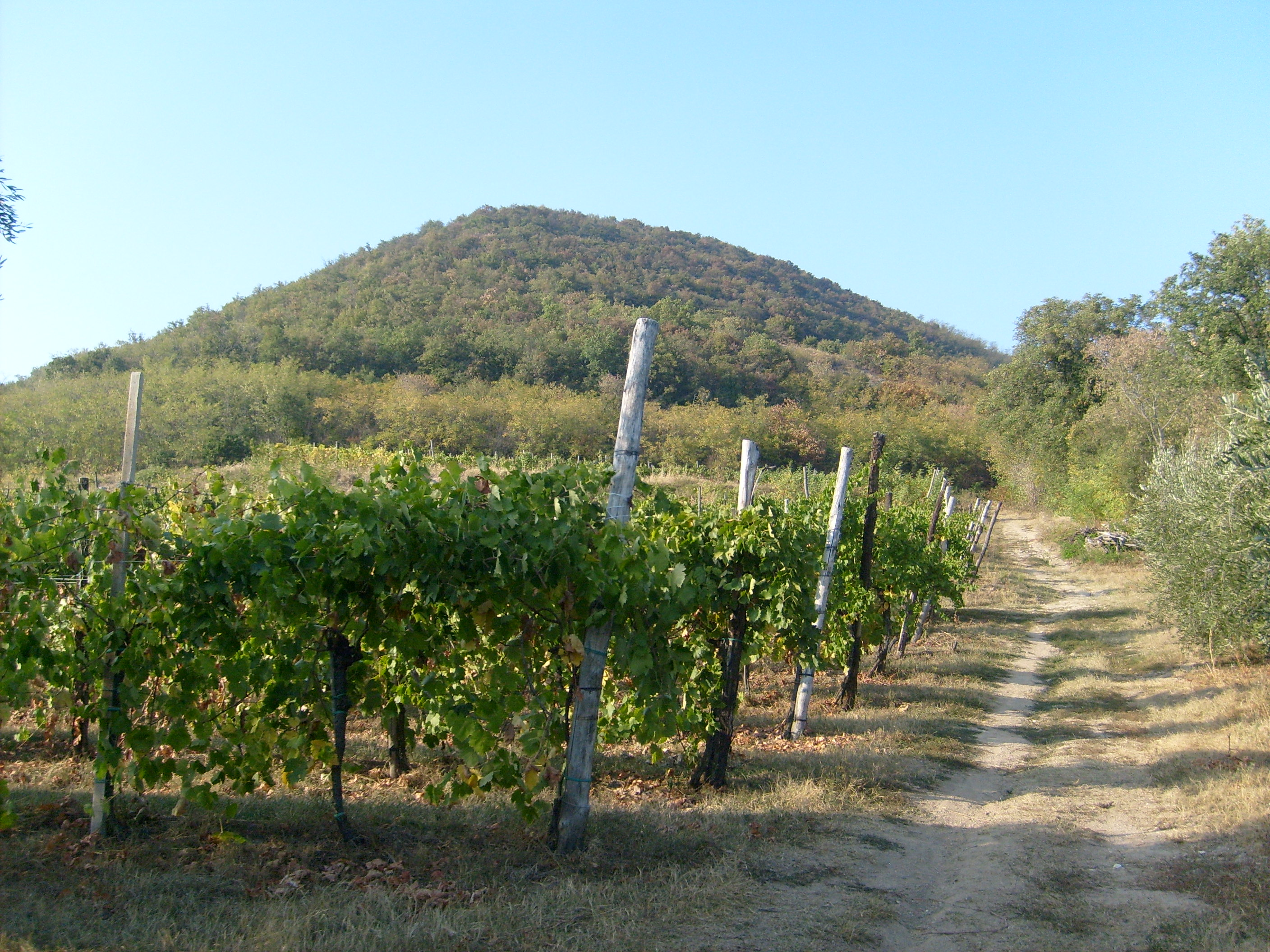

Highest point
- Elevation: 282 m (925 ft)
- Coordinates: 45°16′45″N 11°39′13″E

Geography
- Location within Italy
- Location: Veneto, Italy

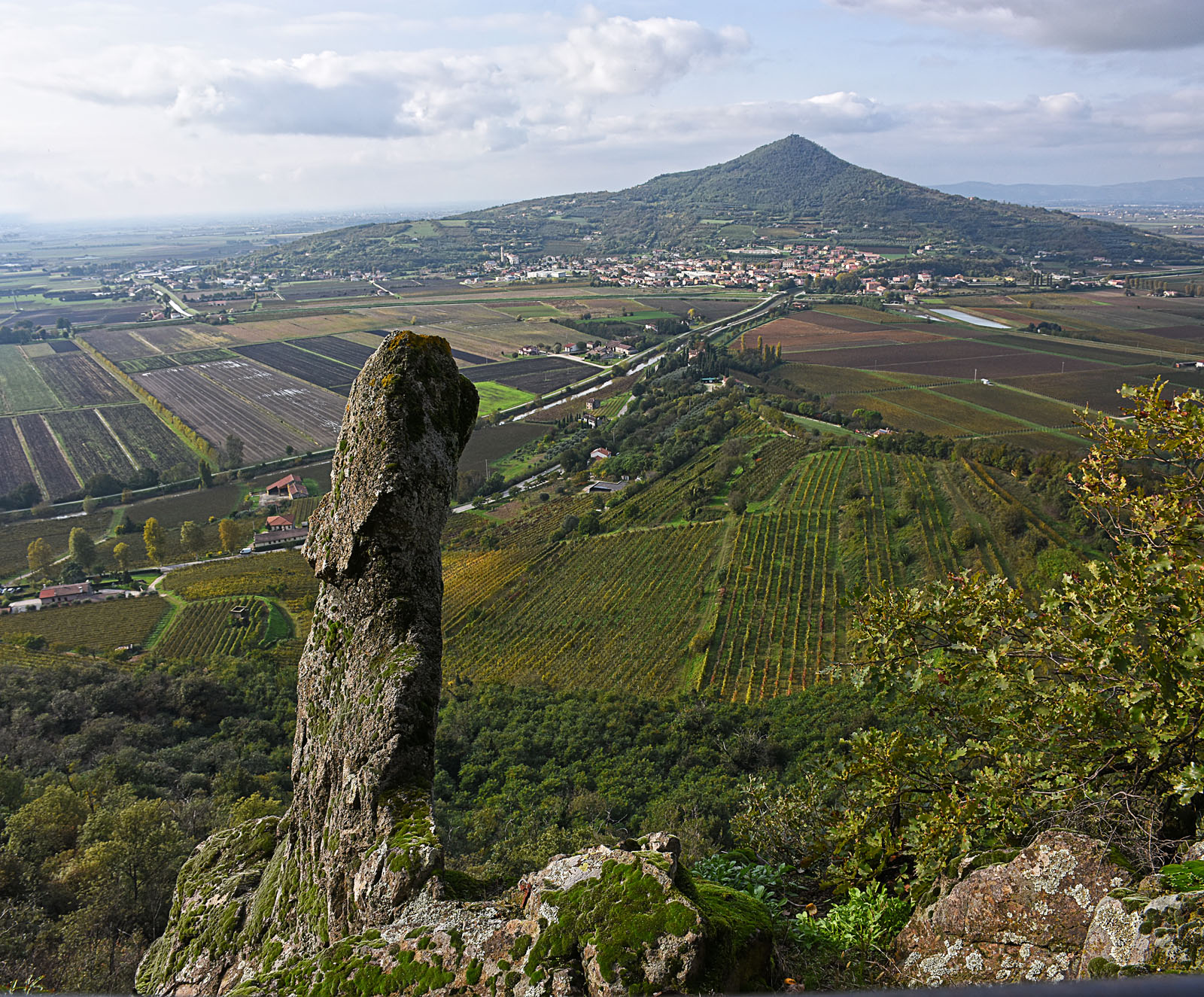
The view from Busso dei Briganti towards the NW

Monte Cinto (Colli Euganei) is a hill of the Veneto, Italy. It has an elevation of 282 metres (925 ft).
