= Monte Cecilia =

Mountain in Italy

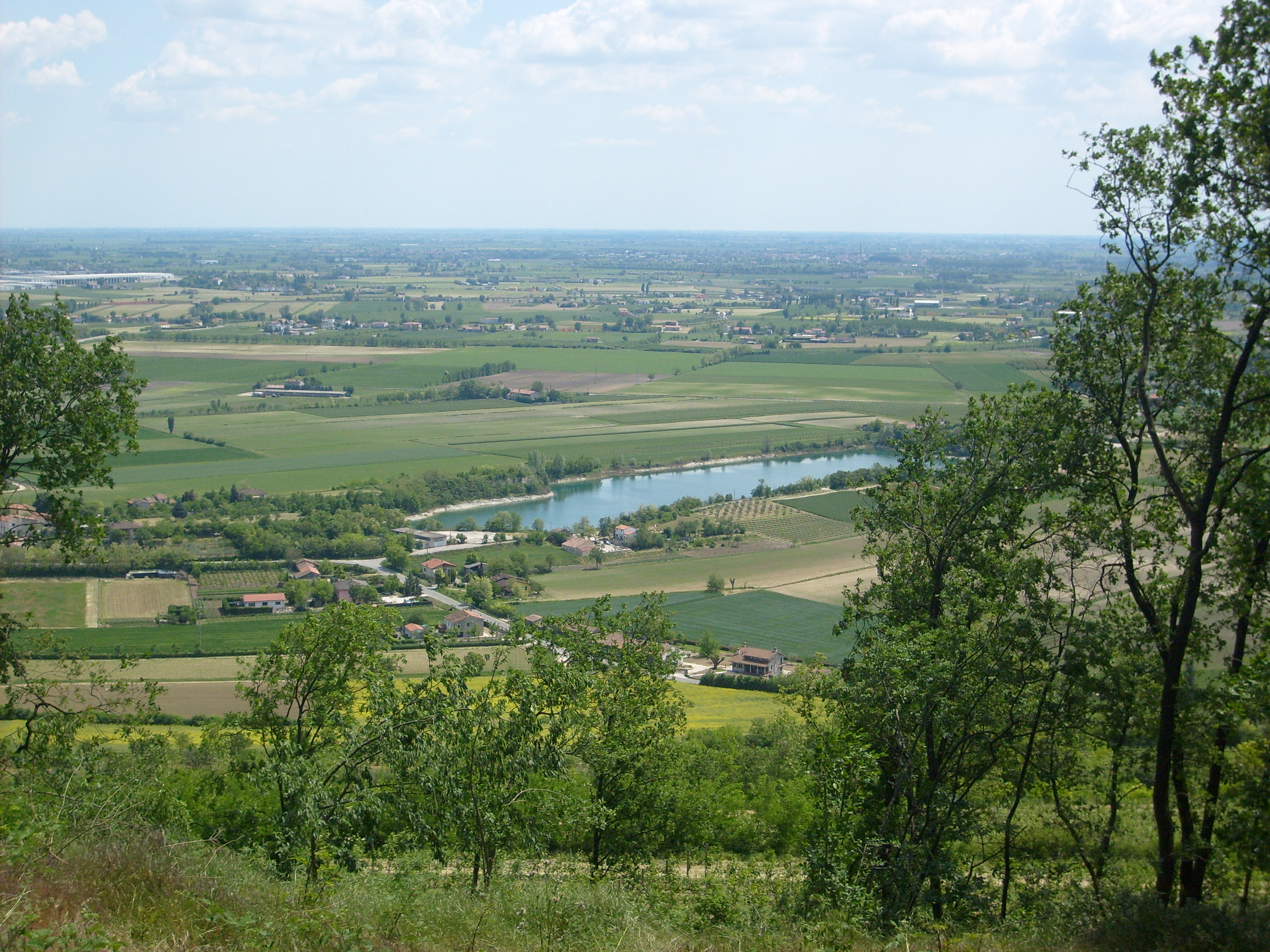

Highest point
- Elevation: 199 m (653 ft)
- Coordinates: 45°14′49″N 11°41′52″E

Geography
- Location within Italy
- Location: Veneto, Italy

Monte Cecilia is a hill of the Veneto, Italy. It has an elevation of 199 metres (653 ft).
