= Agugliaro =

- Comune
- Comune di Agugliaro
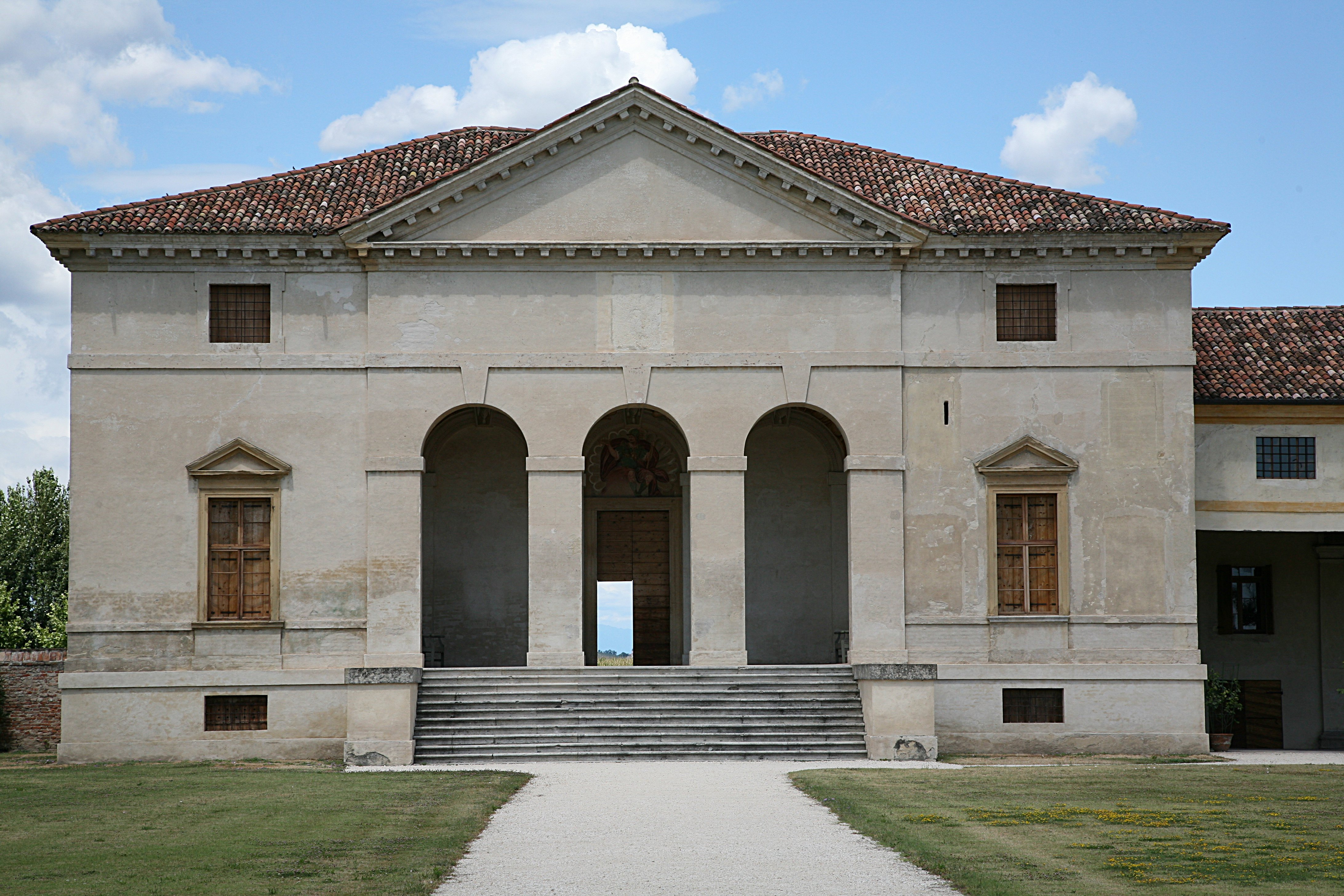
- Villa Saraceno

- Location within Italy Location within Veneto
- Coordinates: 45°20′N 11°35′E
- Country: Italy
- Region: Veneto
- Province: Province of Vicenza (VI)
- Frazioni: Calliana, Capitello, Finale, Sopra L'Acqua, Punta, Paluselli

Government
  - Mayor: Massimo Borghettini

Area
  - Total: 14.7 km^{2} (5.7 sq mi)
- Elevation: 13 m (43 ft)

Population (30 November 2021)
  - Total: 1,391
  - Density: 94.6/km^{2} (245/sq mi)
- Demonym: Agugliaresi
- Time zone: UTC+1 (CET)
  - Summer (DST): UTC+2 (CEST)
- Postal code: 36020
- Dialing code: 0444
- Patron saint: St. Bartholomew
- Saint day: 24 August
- Website: Official website

Agugliaro is a town and comune in the province of Vicenza, Veneto, north-eastern Italy. It is located east of road SP247 provincial road, between the Berici Hills and the Euganean Hills.

In the hamlet of Finale di Agugliaro is the 16th-century Villa Saraceno, which was designed by Palladio and is conserved as part of a World Heritage Site. Other patrician villas in the area include Villa Dal Verme and the Barchesse Trolio. Other sights include the church of San Michele Arcangelo and the Oratory of San Bernardino.

== Sister cities ==
Agugliaro

- Nova Odessa, Brazil
