= Rusta, Iran =

Rusta روستا
- village
- Location within Iran
- Coordinates: 32°42′10″N 49°38′23″E
- Country: Iran
- Province: Chaharmahal and Bakhtiari
- County: Kuhrang
- Bakhsh: Central
- Rural District: Miankuh-e Moguyi

Population (2006)
  - Total: 47
- Time zone: UTC+3:30 (IRST)
  - Summer (DST): UTC+4:30 (IRDT)
- ISO 3166 code: IRN

Rusta (Persian: روستا, also Romanized as Rūstā) is a village in Miankuh-e Moguyi Rural District, in the Central District of Kuhrang County, Chaharmahal and Bakhtiari Province, Iran. At the 2006 census, its population was 47, in 7 families. The village is populated by Lurs.
