= Monte Rua =

Mountain in Italy

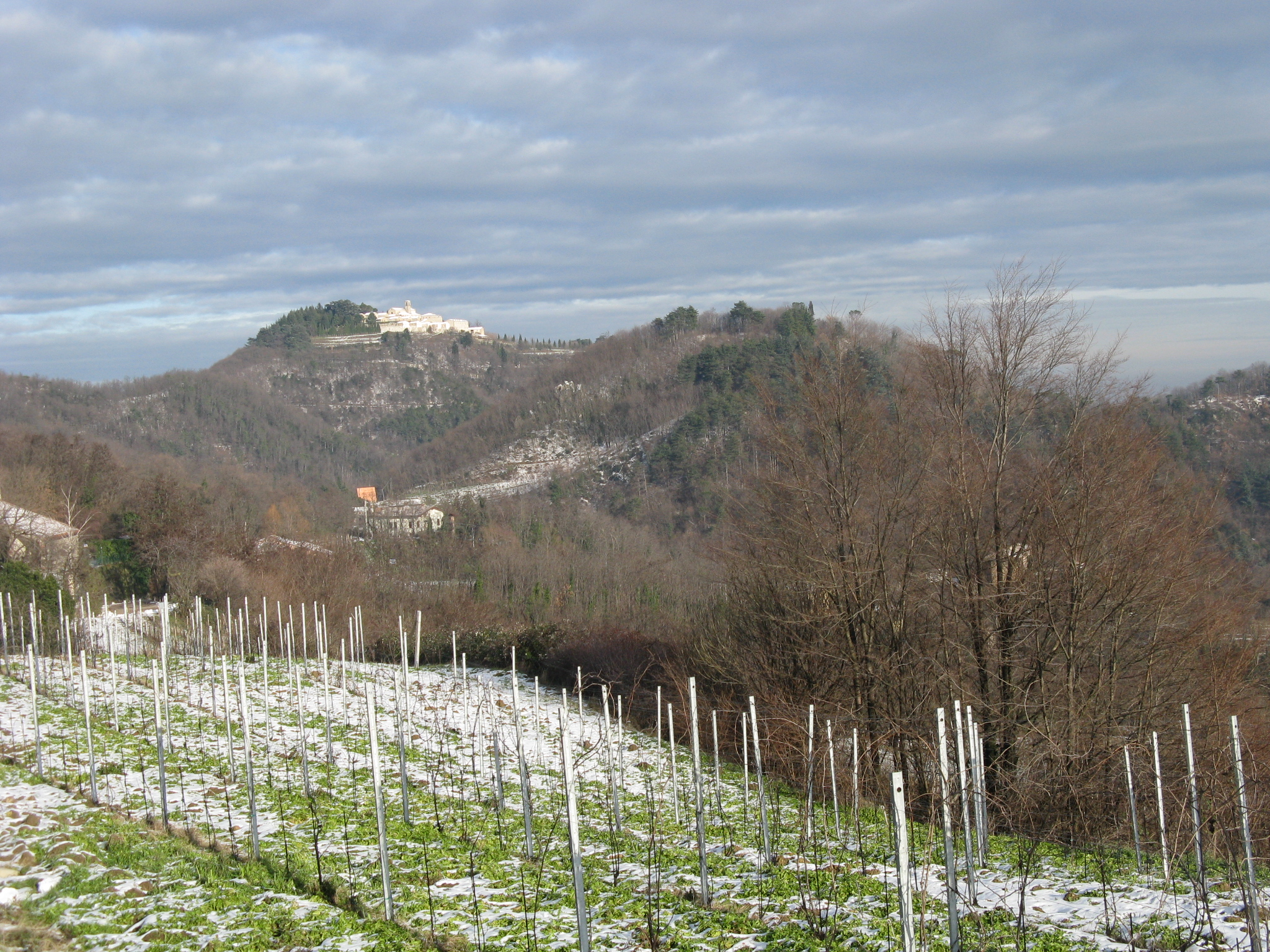

Highest point
- Elevation: 416 m (1,365 ft)
- Coordinates: 45°18′49″N 11°41′21″E

Geography
- Location within Alps
- Location: Torreglia, Galzignano Terme
- Parent range: Euganean Hills

Monte Rua is a mountain in the Euganean Hills of Padua Province, Italy. There is a hermitage located on the mountain's summit.

The summit has an elevation of 416 m (1,365 ft). Monte Rua is located in 2 different municipalities, the summit is divided between Galzignano Terme and Torreglia
