= Cinto Euganeo =

- Comune
- Comune di Cinto Euganeo
- Location within Italy Location within Veneto
- Coordinates: 45°17′N 11°40′E
- Country: Italy
- Region: Veneto
- Province: Province of Padua (PD)

Area
  - Total: 19.7 km^{2} (7.6 sq mi)

Population (Dec. 2004)
  - Total: 2,104
  - Density: 107/km^{2} (277/sq mi)
- Time zone: UTC+1 (CET)
  - Summer (DST): UTC+2 (CEST)
- Postal code: 35030
- Dialing code: 0429

Cinto Euganeo is a comune (municipality) in the Province of Padua in the Italian region Veneto, located about 50 kilometres (31 mi) southwest of Venice and about 20 kilometres (12 mi) southwest of Padua. As of 31 December 2004, it had a population of 2,104 and an area of 19.7 square kilometres (7.6 mi^{2}).

Cinto Euganeo borders the following municipalities: Baone, Galzignano Terme, Lozzo Atestino, Vo.

== Demographic evolution ==
Historical population

Year	Pop.	±%
1861	?	—
1871	2,016	—
1881	2,123	+5.3%
1901	2,552	+20.2%
1911	2,883	+13.0%

Year	Pop.	±%
1921	2,921	+1.3%
1931	2,988	+2.3%
1936	3,134	+4.9%
1951	3,452	+10.1%
1961	2,483	−28.1%

Year	Pop.	±%
1971	2,203	−11.3%
1981	2,103	−4.5%
1991	2,062	−1.9%
2001	2,039	−1.1%

Source: Data from ISTAT
