= Monte Rusta =

Mountain in Italy

Coordinates: 45°17′09″N 11°40′41″E

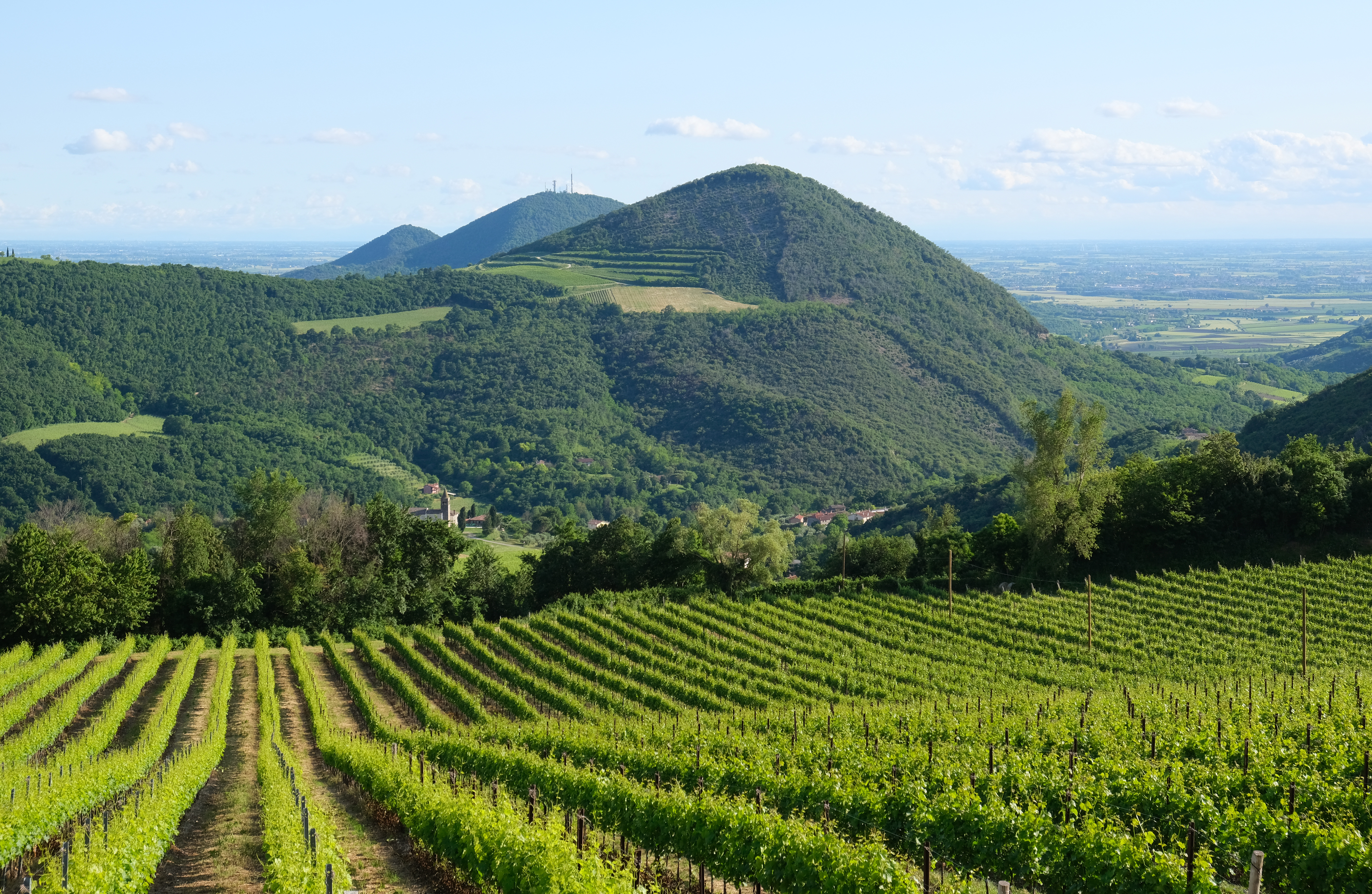

Highest point
- Elevation: 396 m (1,299 ft)

Geography
- Location: Veneto, Italy

Monte Rusta is a mountain of the Veneto, Italy. It has an elevation of 396 metres.
