= Galzignano Terme =

Comune in Veneto, Italy

- Comune
- Comune di Galzignano Terme
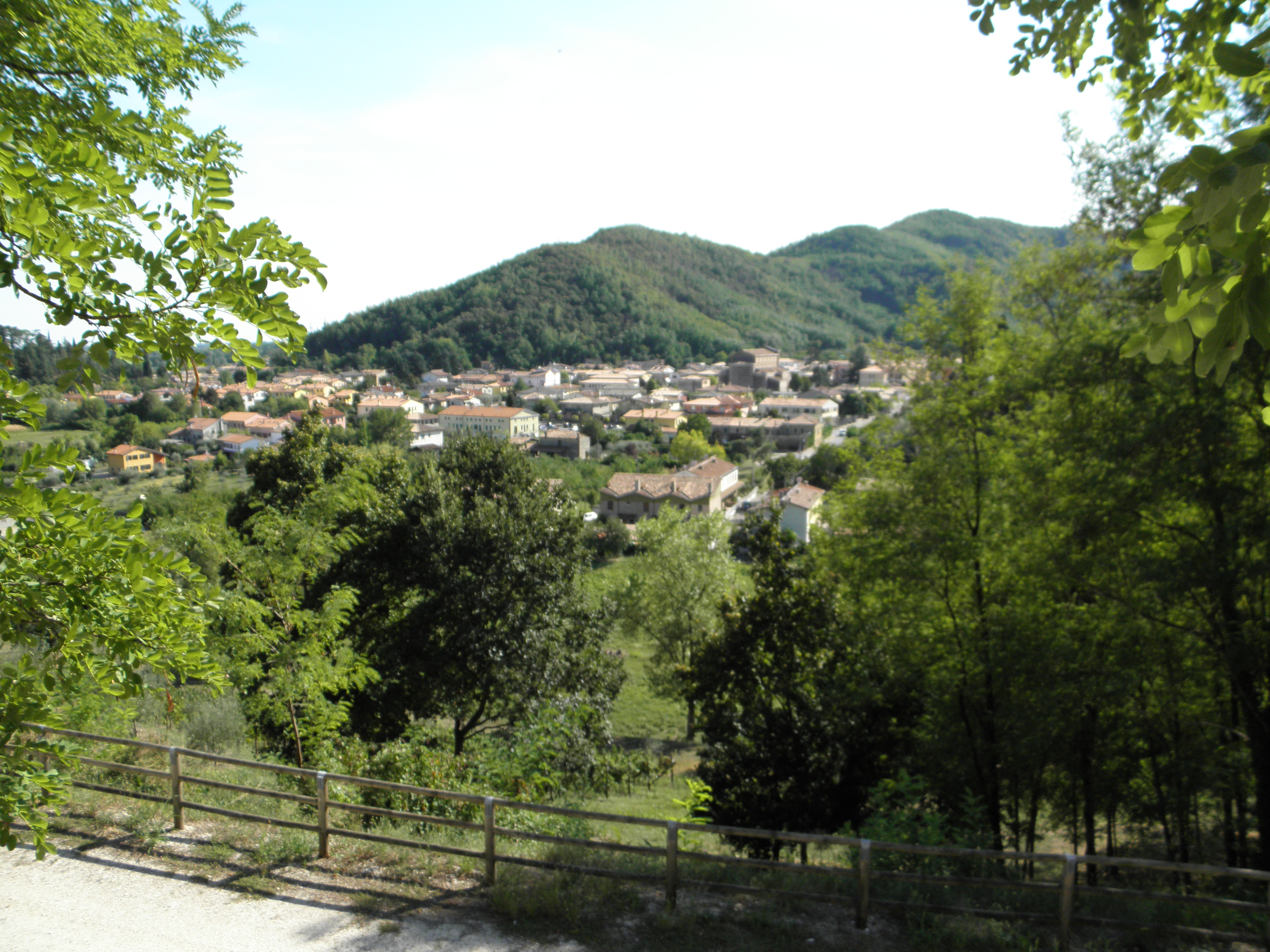

- Location within Italy Location within Veneto
- Coordinates: 45°18′N 11°44′E
- Country: Italy
- Region: Veneto
- Province: Padua (PD)
- Frazioni: Canova, Cengolina Sottovenda, Civrana, Grottarole, Noiera, Regazzoni, Valsanzibio

Government
  - Mayor: Riccardo Masin

Area
  - Total: 18.1 km^{2} (7.0 sq mi)
- Elevation: 22 m (72 ft)

Population (2008)
  - Total: 4,411
  - Density: 244/km^{2} (631/sq mi)
- Demonym: Galzignanesi
- Time zone: UTC+1 (CET)
  - Summer (DST): UTC+2 (CEST)
- Postal code: 35030
- Dialing code: 049
- Patron saint: Madonna del Rosario
- Saint day: 7 October
- Website: Official website

Galzignano Terme (Venetian: Galsignán) is an Italian comune (municipality) in the Province of Padua in the Veneto region, about 50 kilometres (31 mi) southwest of Venice and about 15 kilometres (9 mi) southwest of Padua.

== Comune name ==
The academic Olivieri thought that the name of Galzignano came from the Latin word Gallicinus, with the suffix -anu, suggesting the Lord of the territory inspired the name of the future town of Galzignano Terme.

== History ==
The oldest known document mentioning the name of the town of Galzignano dates to February 9, 952 ACE, when Holy Roman Emperor Otto I said:

"In Galzignano mansiones tres"

In other documents found in Verona from February 14, 1077 ACE appears the quote:

“Villa que dicitur Galzegnano”

The town's origins are ancient; a boundary stone discovered in 1922 demonstrates that it was occupied by the Romans during the Roman period. Galzignano also houses a Franciscan monastery built in 1226 ACE.

Between the 12th and 13th centuries, during the conflict between the Guelphs and Ghibellines, Galzignano was an important and almost autonomous area controlled by the podesta of Padua. The territory was later occupied by Venice, Austria, and France before becoming a part of the Kingdom of Italy in 1866 ACE.

== Main sights ==
- The area's main attraction, Villa Barbarigo Pizzoni Ardemani, located in the frazione Valsanzibio, which has a notable 17th century garden
- Ruins of the Benedictine monastery of Santa Maria Annunziata
- Camaldolese hermitage of Monte Rua
- Ruins of the 13th century Benedictine monastery of St. John the Baptist on Monte Venda
- Santa Maria Assunta Church, rebuilt in 1674
- San Lorenzo di Valsanzibio parish church
- Oratory of the Holy Trinity (14th century), featuring some precious frescoes
- Villa Rizzoli Benedetti (1st century, remade in the 18th century)
- Villa La Civrana (17th century)

== Local products ==
=== Olive oil ===
Olive oil is a traditional product of the Mediterranean Basin. Galzignano Terme and other local municipalities all play an important role in olive oil production. Olive trees were introduced in the Euganean Hills long ago and olive farming in the region has been continuous since at least the domination of Venice from 1400 ACE, when olives gained a new global importance.

=== DOC and DOCG wines ===
The Euganean Hills are very important for the production of wine in the Veneto region, with rich terroir for cultivating grapes.

Towns in this area have joined forces to support and promote the products of their respective lands. Since 2002, an association known as La Strada del Vino (“The Wine Street”) has complied a list of all of the restaurants, wine cellars, farms and related companies in the Euganean Hills to promote all the local products and services in the territory.

Galzignano Terme, within the bounds of “The Wine Street," produces Moscato (muscat) and Fior d'Arancio wines:

- Moscato dei Colli Euganei (muscat from Euganean Hills) is a DOC wine ranging from dry to champagne-like. Muscat is made from white muscat grapes and can accompany a variety of dishes, like asparagus and fish.
- Fior d'Arancio dei Colli Euganei (Fior F'Arancio from Euganean Hills) is a DOCG wine. This wine is the best wine in Galzignano Terme and is made in three different varieties:
  - Fior d'Arancio Passito is very sweet, with the taste of honey, fruits (especially apricots) and spices. It can be accompanied by zaleti, a particular type of cookie made with flour and raisins.
  - Fior d'Arancio secco is a very dry and fragrant wine. It can be accompanied by white meat and shellfish.
  - Fior d'arancio Spumante is a sweet and sparkling wine that is low in alcohol and common at parties in the region, particularly with cakes or other desserts.

== Sports ==
=== Football ===
Real Terme
- Full name: A.S.D. Polisportiva Real Terme
- Founded: 2020; 6 years ago
- Ground: Stadio Comunale, Battaglia Terme, Italy
- League: Seconda Categoria

Atletico Galzignano
- Full name: A.S.D. Atletico Galzignano
- Founded: 2020; 6 years ago
- Ground: Stadio Fiorenzo Pirolo, Galzignano Terme, Italy
- League: Terza Categoria
