= Association of Salesian Cooperators =

Lay association in the Catholic Church

The Association of Salesian Cooperators (ASC) is a lay association in the Catholic Church and the third order of the Salesians. It is also one of the three main branches of the Salesian Family founded directly by Don Bosco in 1876. The movement was created with the purpose to share the ideals of the Salesian Preventive System in the education of young people, especially those who are poorest.

The ASC's superior is the Rector Major of the Salesians, inside a board of trust known as the World Council. Priests and bishops of the dioceses can join this movement, sharing the ideals and educative philosophies of Don Bosco.

== History ==
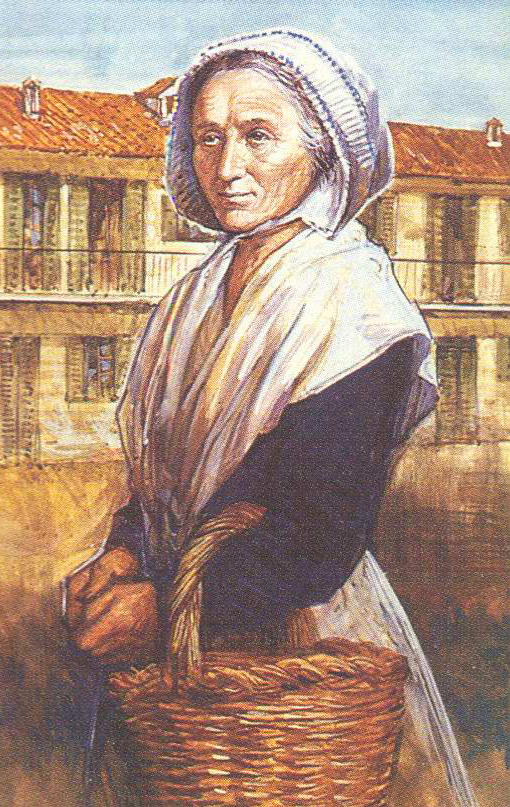
Margherita Occhiena was considered as the first Salesian Cooperator

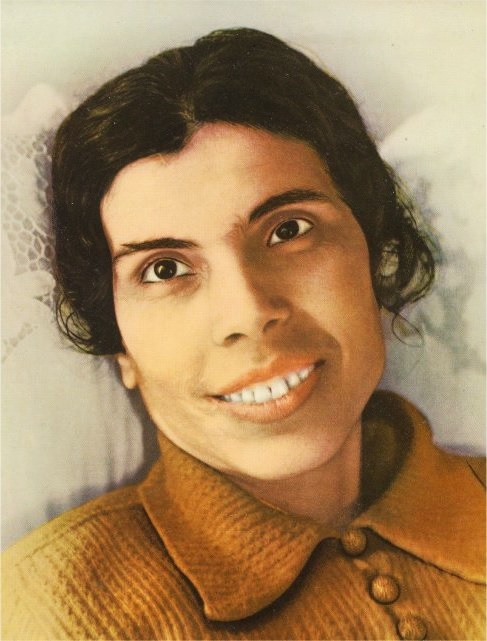
Blessed Alexandrina of Balazar was a mystic and member of the Association of Salesian Cooperators

After John Bosco's ordination, he took up work in Turin, where he was friends with priest and social reformer Joseph Cafasso. In 1846, Bosco became ill and his mother, Margherita Occhiena moved to Turin to care for him. After he recovered, she stayed to assist him in his work with the poor and abandoned boys who were flocking to the city. For the next ten years she served as a surrogate mother for the hundreds of boys who called her "Mamma Margherita". Occhiena is considered the first Salesian Cooperator.

In 1876 Don Bosco discussed his plan to create the Association of Salesian Cooperators, "It has hardly come into existence and it already numbers many members. Its aim is mutual assistance: spiritual, moral and also financial...

Don Bosco formed the Association with the help of Pope Pius IX. The membership grew rapidly, and with their help, the Cooperators made it possible to create and develop workshops for arts and crafts, mutual aid societies, farm projects, printing shops, day and evening schools, oratories, homes and shelters, missions and orphanages.

In 1877, Bosco created the Salesian Bulletin to "link Salesians and cooperators." In the General Chapter of 1877 he reported the development of the cooperators and the Salesian Bulletin. He described the Association as people who wish to devote themselves to works of mercy in a specific rather than general way and he underlined that the mission of the cooperators is to take care of boys, who are exposed to immorality, catechizing them, keeping them happily busy on Sundays and holy days, finding them jobs with honest employers (...)

== Present day ==
Members are lay men and women, or diocesan clergy, who dedicate themselves to the welfare of young people, and live guided by Don Bosco's Salesian Spirit. As of 2023, ACS has a membership of about 30,000, and is present in 58 countries. The headquarters are in Rome.

Generally the Salesian Cooperators are affiliated with a local Salesian school, parish and youth center. In some situations, particularly in the Third World, they manage oratories, schools and family hostels.

== Candidates for Sainthood ==
Saints

- John Bosco (16 August 1815 – 31 January 1888), founder of the Association, canonized on 1 April 1934

Blesseds

- Antonio María Rodríguez Blanco (26 March 1877 – 16 August 1936), Martyr of the Spanish Civil War, beatified on 28 October 2007
- Teresa Cejudo Redondo de Caballero (15 October 1890 – 20 September 1936), Martyr of the Spanish Civil War, beatified on 28 October 2007
- Bartolomé Blanco Márquez (25 November 1914 – 2 October 1936), Martyr of the Spanish Civil War, beatified on 28 October 2007
- Alexandre Planas Saurí (31 October 1878 – 19 November 1936), Martyr of the Spanish Civil War, beatified on 11 March 2001
- Alexandrina Maria da Costa (Alexandrina de Balazar) (30 March 1904 – 13 October 1955), mystic, beatified on 25 April 2004

Venerables

- Margherita Occhiena Bosco (1 April 1788 – 25 November 1856), mother of Don Bosco and considered as the first Salesian Cooperator, declared Venerable on 23 October 2006
- Antonia Dorotea de Chopitea de Villota (4 June 1816 – 3 April 1891), Chilean philanthropist, declared Venerable on 9 June 1983
- Attilio Giordani (13 February 1913 - 8 December 1972), member, declared Venerable on 9 October 2013
- Felice Canelli (14 October 1880 - 23 November 1977), priest of the Diocese of San Severo and member of the Association, declared Venerable on 22 May 2021

Servants of God

- José García-Verdugo Menoyo (17 March 1895 - 20 October 1936), Martyr of the Spanish Civil War from the Archdiocese of Toledo
- Victorina Rivara de Perazzo (3 April 1867 - 24 September 1957), Argentinian Cooperator, declared as a Servant of God on 11 December 1989
- Matilde Salem (15 November 1904 – 27 February 1961), Syrian Cooperator, declared as a Servant of God on 4 February 1994
- Vera Grita (28 January 1923 - 22 December 1969), member, declared as a Servant of God on 22 May 2021
- Dante di Stefano (25 September 1951 - 31 July 1989), Argentinian Cooperator, declared as a Servant of God on 13 September 2022

== Other notable members ==
- Sean Devereux
