= Saint John Bosco: Mission to Love =

- Directed by: Lodovico Gasparini
- Starring: Flavio Insinna
- Theme music composer: Marco Frisina
- Original languages: Italian; English

Production
- Cinematography: Giovanni Galasso
- Running time: 196 min. (2ep)

Original release
- Network: Rai 1
- Release: 22 September – 23 September 2004

Saint John Bosco: Mission to Love (Italian: Don Bosco) is an Italian television miniseries directed by Lodovico Gasparini that aired on 22 and 23r September 2004 on Rai 1. It's based on real life events of Roman Catholic priest John Bosco.

== Cast ==
- Flavio Insinna as Don Giovanni Bosco
- Lina Sastri as Margherita Occhiena
- Charles Dance as Marquis Clementi
- Alessandra Martines as Marchesa Barolo
- Daniel Tschirley as Michele Rua
- Ry Finerty as Giovanni Cagliero
- Lewis Crutch as Domenico Savio
- James Greene as Giuseppe Cafasso
- Paolo Calabresi as Lorenzo Gastaldi
- Arnaldo Ninchi as Pope Pius IX
- Brock Everitt-Elwick as Young Giovanni Bosco
- Sam Beazley as Don Giovanni Calosso
- Andrea Bosca as Enrico Zarello

== Synopsis ==
Piedmont, Italy. 19th century. In Turin, the priest Don Bosco, a man from a humble farming family, he gave himself totally and passionately to the task of collecting from the streets to marginalized children and care for them. Not only out of poverty, ignorance and social distress, but it got for the first time, to feel loved. He fought with extraordinary faith and tenacity to overcome obstacles and snares that both the civilian and ecclesiastical authorities, they put in their path to prevent him from completing his goal: the founding of the Congregation of the Salesians, which would guarantee the future of their children.

== Crew ==
- Director: Lodovico Gasparini
- Writer: Graziano Diana
- Composer : Marco Frisina
- Producer : Luca Bernabei
