= Monument to Don John Bosco, Turin =

Monument in Turin, Italy

Monument to Don John Bosco
- Monumento a Don Bosco
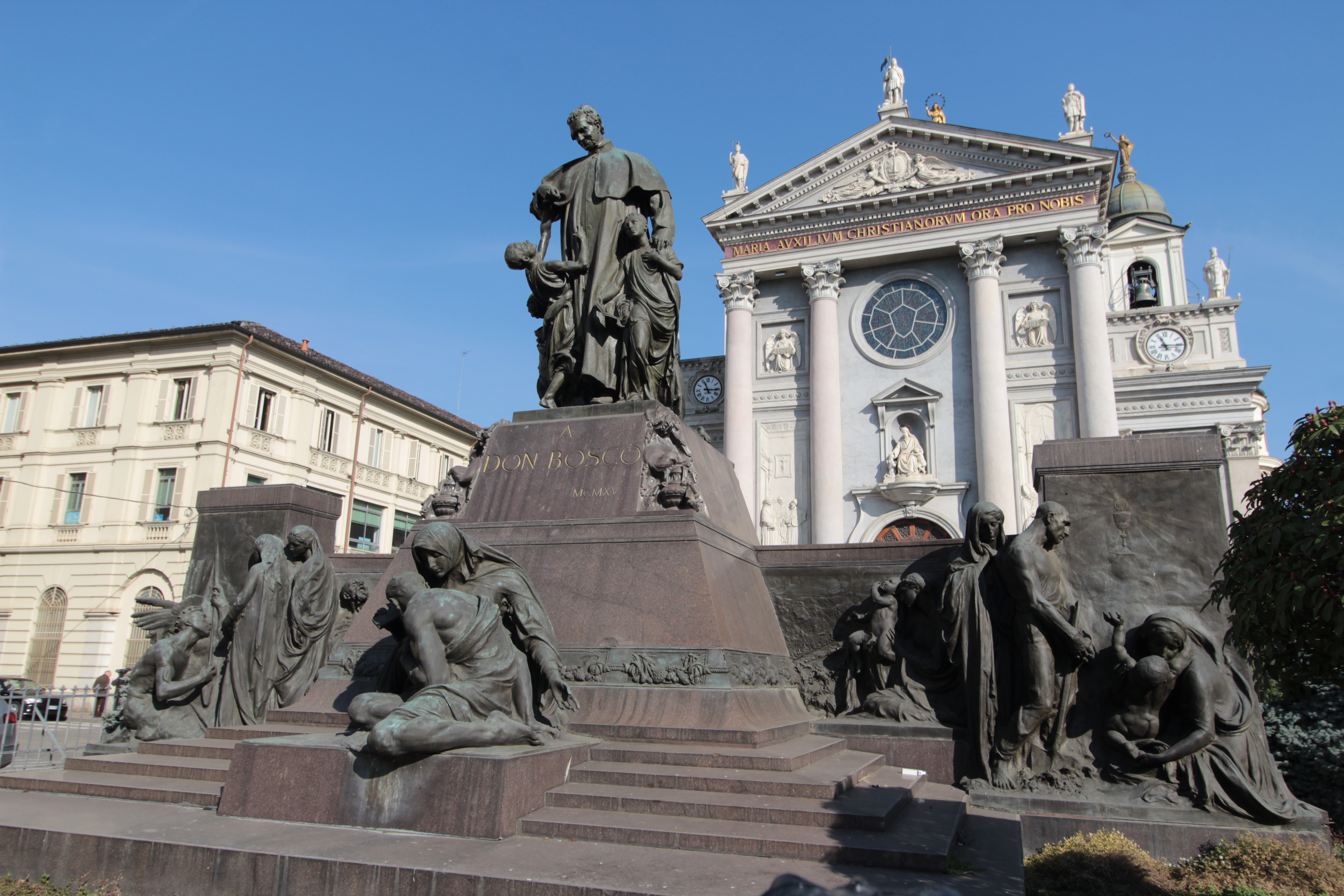
- Monument standing in front of facade of Santa Maria Ausiliatrice
- Interactive map of Monument to Don John Bosco
- Location: Turin
- Coordinates: 45°04′50″N 7°40′32″E
- Designer: Gaetano Cellini
- Material: Bronze and stone
- Dedicated date: 23 May 1920

The Monument to Don John Bosco is a large bronze and stone sculptural memorial, inaugurated on 23 May 1920, located in Piazza Maria Ausiliatrice, in front of the Basilica church of Santa Maria Ausiliatrice in central Turin, region of Piedmont, Italy. The body of Giovanni Melchiorre Bosco, beatified in 1934, is buried in the church.

== History ==
The Salesian order of priests, which focused on helping and educating the poor, had its main offices next the adjacent church. The monument was planned to be finished by 1915, to celebrate the centenary of the birth of Don Bosco; however, completion was delayed by World War I. Bosco died in 1888 and was declared blessed in 1907. The Salesian order was able to raise 200 thousand lira from patrons and the city council of Turin added another 20 thousand lire. The monument was designed by Gaetano Cellini. The monument has a central pyramidal plinth with a bronze statue of John Bosco, smiling as he looks down at surrounding children. Below are a series of partial reliefs depicting the missions and schools of Bosco the Salesian order. The man in the center leans to kiss a crucifix in the hands of a madonna-like figure, referring to Bosco's stated aim to "restore everything with Christ". Below are reliefs where mothers and children, disabled men and workers seek aid.
