= Sean Devereux =

British aid worker killed in Somalia (1964–1993)

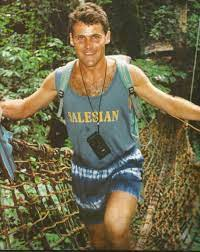
- Devereux, Salesian aid worker, in Liberia
- Born: 25 November 1964; Camberley, Surrey, England, UK
- Died: 2 January 1993 (aged 28); Kismayo, Somalia
- Cause of death: Assassination (gunshot wound)
- Occupations: Teacher, Aid Worker
- Years active: 1985–1993

Sean Devereux (25 November 1964 – 2 January 1993) was a British Salesian aid worker assassinated in Kismayo, Somalia in 1993 while working for UNICEF. He has since become an important role model for the aid-working vocation, particularly among Christians.

== Life ==
Sean Devereux was the only son of Dermot Devereux, a British Airways cabin steward from Wexford, Ireland, and his wife Maureen, a nurse from Cork. He grew up in Yateley, Hampshire with his two sisters, Theresa and Tania. From 1975 to 1982, he was a pupil at Salesian College, Farnborough. He gained a BSc in Sports science and Geography from the University of Birmingham, followed by a PGCE from the University of Exeter. He became a popular master of Physical Education at the Salesian School, Chertsey, Surrey, teaching for two academic years before departing to take up a teaching position in Africa. He was an active member of the Salesian Cooperators and the Salesian Past Pupils’ Association.

He arrived in Liberia in February 1989 and began teaching work with the Salesian community at St. Francis School in Tappita District, briefly finding himself imprisoned after pleading for the release of a student drafted into the army as a child-soldier. In his second year, escalating violence during the Liberian Civil War had forced the school to close and Devereux joined the UN refugee agency, where on one occasion he was beaten by soldiers after confronting one of them for attempting to steal food meant for refugees. He single-handedly organized the feeding of 750,000 people in Monrovia. By getting two teams to compete he managed to raise the amount of food moved from 150 to 800 tons a day. Ultimately he was ordered out of the country in September 1992 and Devereux duly left for a brief stint in Sierra Leone.

== Assassination ==
Devereux then began working with UNICEF in Somalia, where he was assigned to organise relief for the starving, particularly children, in Kismayo, the stronghold of one of many warlords. After only four months in the country, he was fatally shot in the back of the head by a lone hired gunman while walking near the UNICEF compound on Saturday, 2 January 1993. The assassination was ordered by the NPFL; Devereux had previously "been assaulted for refusing to release food to Taylor's forces." His assassination came on the eve of the visit to Mogadishu by UN Secretary General Boutros Boutros-Ghali. He was 28 years old.

Dr. Boutrus-Boutrus Ghali said:

In adverse, and often dangerous circumstances Sean showed complete dedication to his work. His colleagues admired his energy, his courage, and his compassion. Sean was an exemplary staff member and gave his life serving others, in the true spirit of the United Nations. Sean was a real soldier of Peace."

== Legacy ==
The Devereux family established the "Sean Devereux Children's Fund" (SDCF) to support the education of children in Liberia. The Devereux building at Salesian School, Chertsey, which contains the Geography and English departments, is named after him.

'Sean Devereux Park' in Yateley is named in his honour and a plaque commemorates him.

A BBC Everyman Documentary was produced about Sean Devereux. It is called 'Mr Sean' and was created in May 1993. This was followed by a BAFTA-nominated movie about Sean called 'The Dying of the Light'.

In October 2024, Seans Mother - Maureen Devereux received an MBE from King Charles in recognition of her charitable work in Sean's memory - across Africa through the Sean Devereux Children's Fund.
