= Thérèse Bertone =

French athlete (1900–1984)

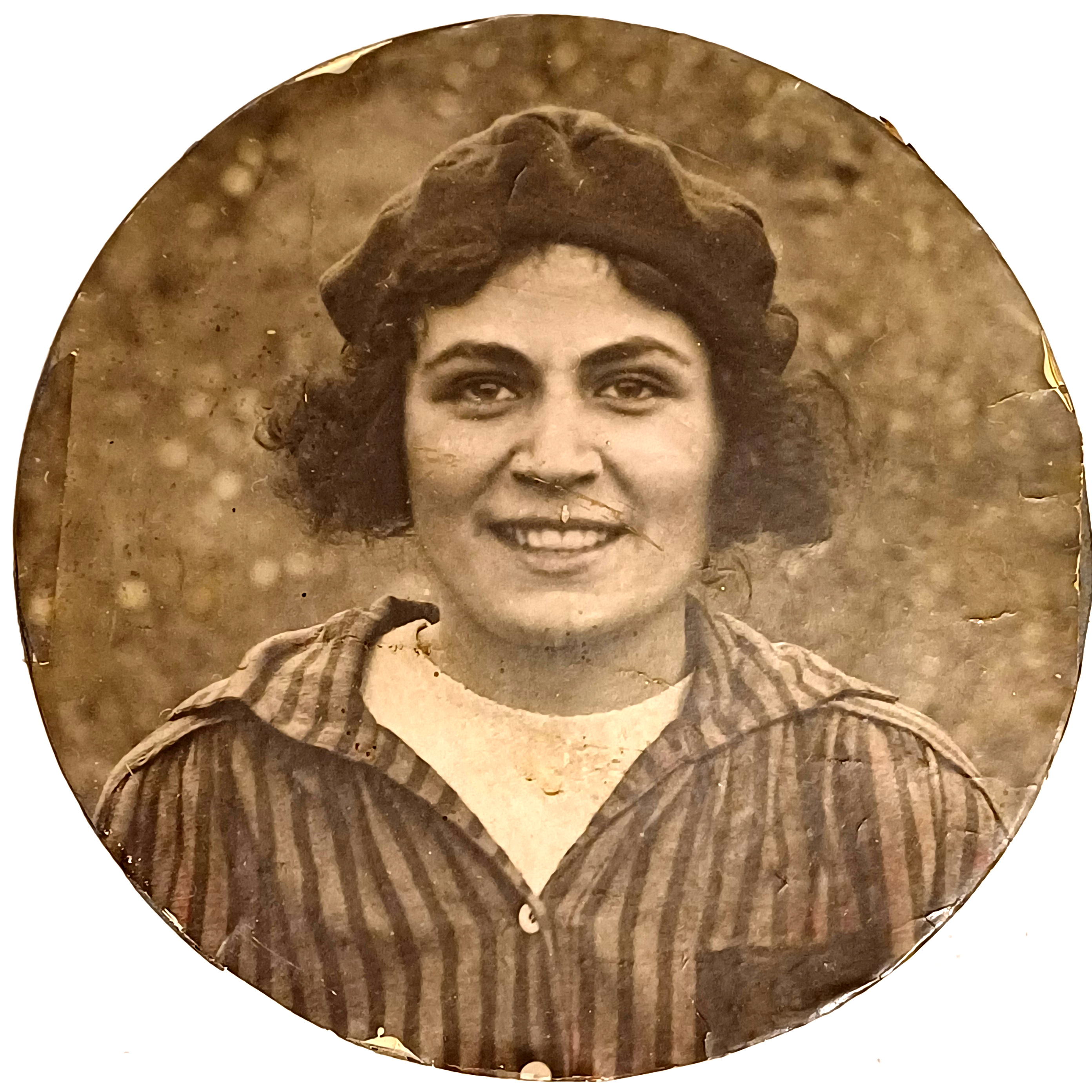
- Monnet's portrait in 1923

Personal information
- Nickname: Monnet
- Born: 18 March 1900
- Died: 17 March 1984 (aged 83)

Sport
- Sport: Athletics, Field hockey
- Event(s): 250m, 4 × 100 m, 4x175m relay
Medal record
Representing France
1923 Women's Olympiad
| Bronze medal – third place | 1923 Monte Carlo | 250 m |
| Silver medal – second place | 1923 Monte Carlo | 4x100 m |
| Silver medal – second place | 1923 Monte Carlo | 4x175 m |

Thérèse Bertone (Turin, Italy, 1900 – Montfermeil, Paris, 1984) was a French athlete who won three medals at the 1923 Women's Olympiad under the nickname Monnet due to social pressures faced by women at the time and was part of the Lyon Olympic University field hockey team.

== Life ==
Bertone was born in Turin and arrived in France at the end of 1901 with her parents and older sister Marguerite. Around 1900, her family sold their market garden lands in Valdocco (now part of the municipality of Turin, Italy) for a modest sum to the Salesian community headed by Don Rua. She passed the Certificat d'Études in Lyon and learned the profession of seamstress. She became actively involved in sports and was trained by her brother-in-law, Pierre Stenghel. Hiring a professional trainer would have been financially burdensome given her limited weekly earnings. Her mother refused to let her daughter practice sports under her true name, so she took the name of her trainer's half-brother, Monnet.

=== Women's field hockey team ===
The women's field hockey section of the LOU was created in 1906. The first matches often took place on 'cow fields' and the equipment of the time had nothing in common with today's equipment. According to the 1 January 1921 edition of Le Sportif, she was known as Monnet and is one of the five forwards on the L.O.U hockey team, distinguished by red and black blouses and black berets.

=== 1923 Women's Olympiad (Monte Carlo) ===
At the time, a part of public opinion still claimed that only 'street girls' practiced sports. Thérèse Bertone's license card from the Fédération Féminine Française de Sports Athlétiques (F.F.F.S.A) is in the name of Thérèse Monnet. Under her nickname 'Monnet', she won the bronze medal on 7 April at the 1923 Women's Olympiad of Monaco. Numerous newspapers chronicled her athletic achievements.

=== End of the athletic career ===
Thérèse Bertone married Claude Eugène Murigneux (1893–1966) in June 1923 and definitively ended her athletic career in order to take care of her family.

== Gallery ==
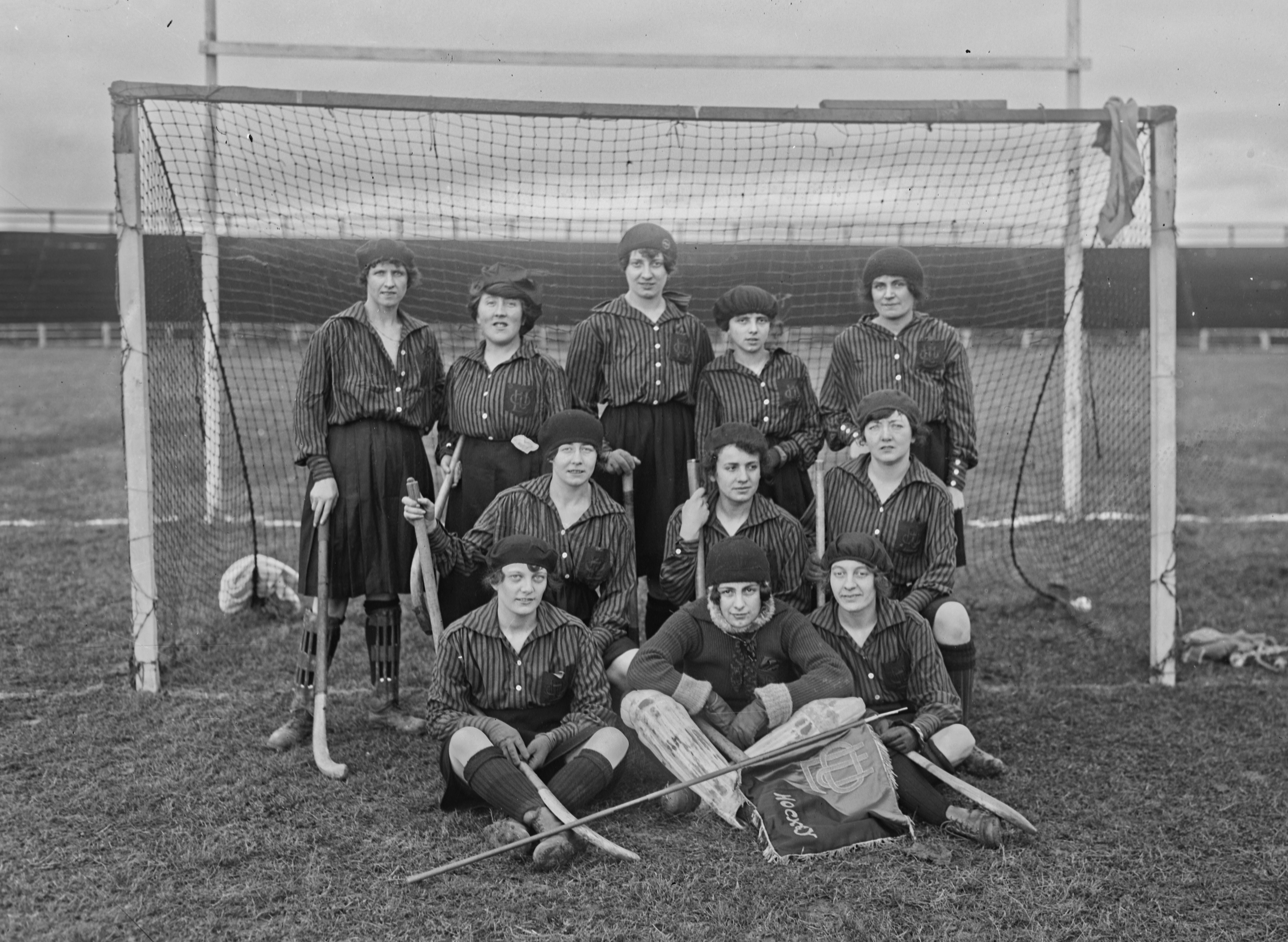
The women's field hockey team of LOU in 1921. Monnet is in the top right of the last row.

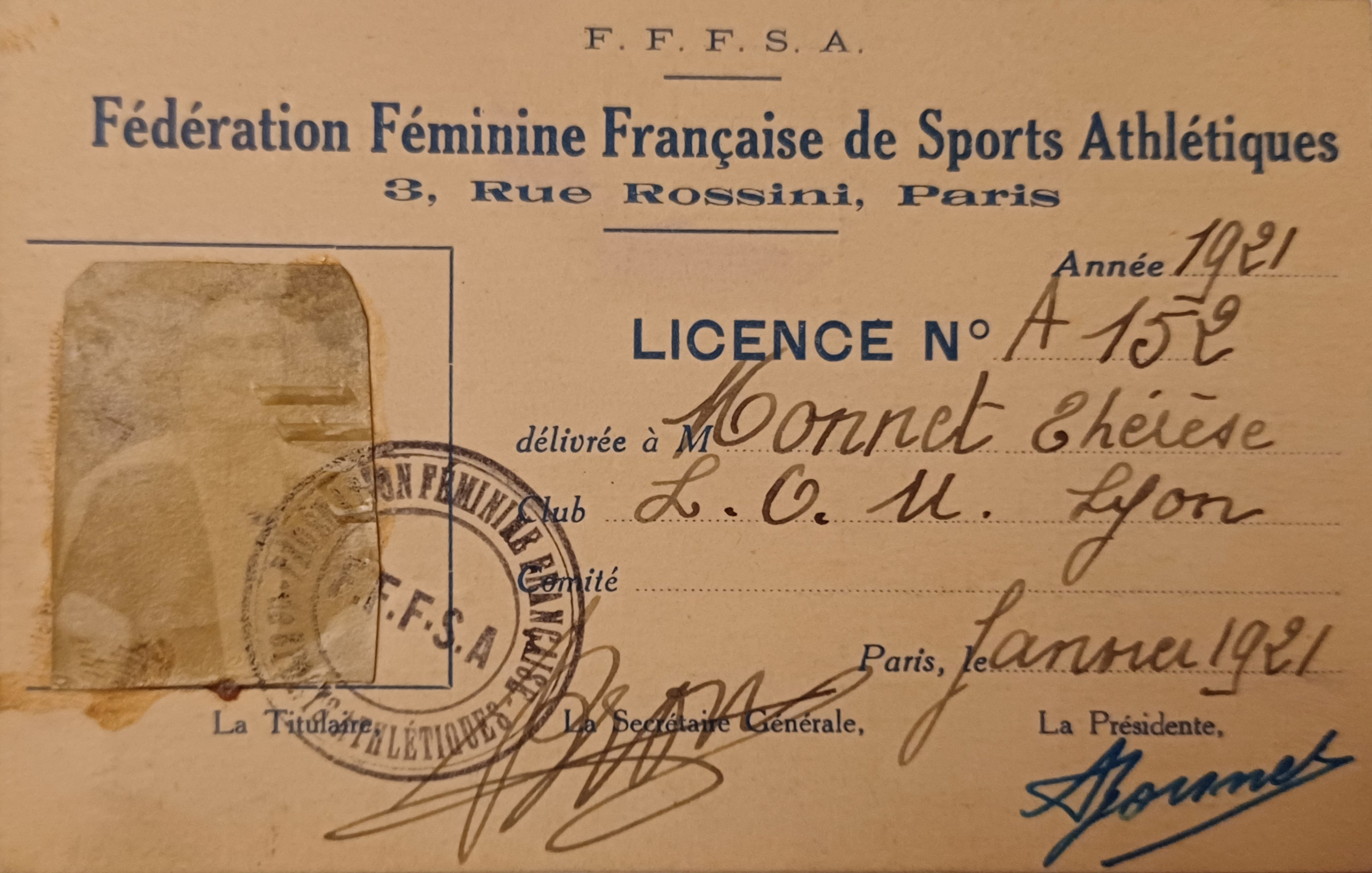
Thérèse Monnet's Licence FFFSA in 1921

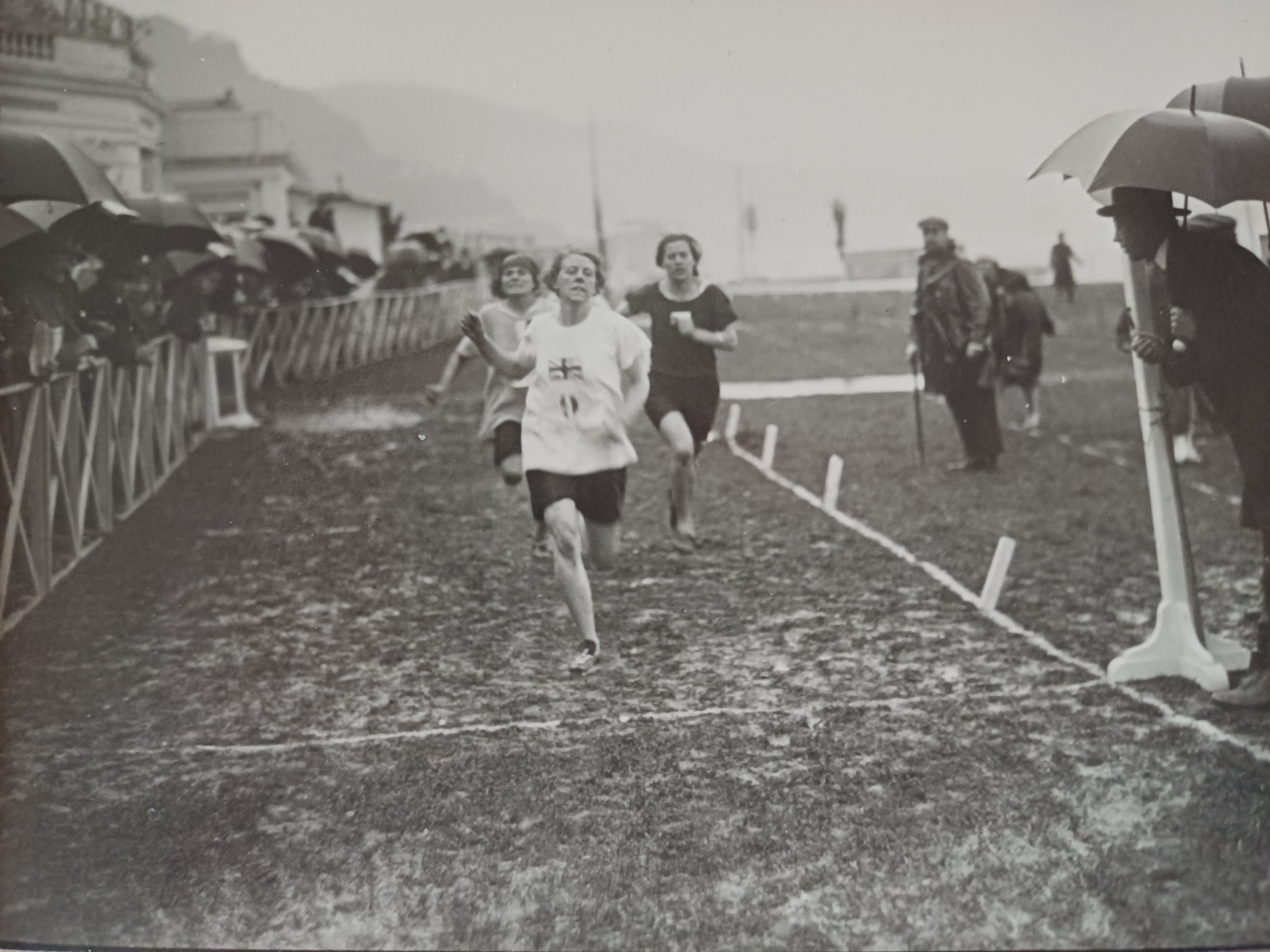
Monnet in third position at the 1923 Women's Olympiad

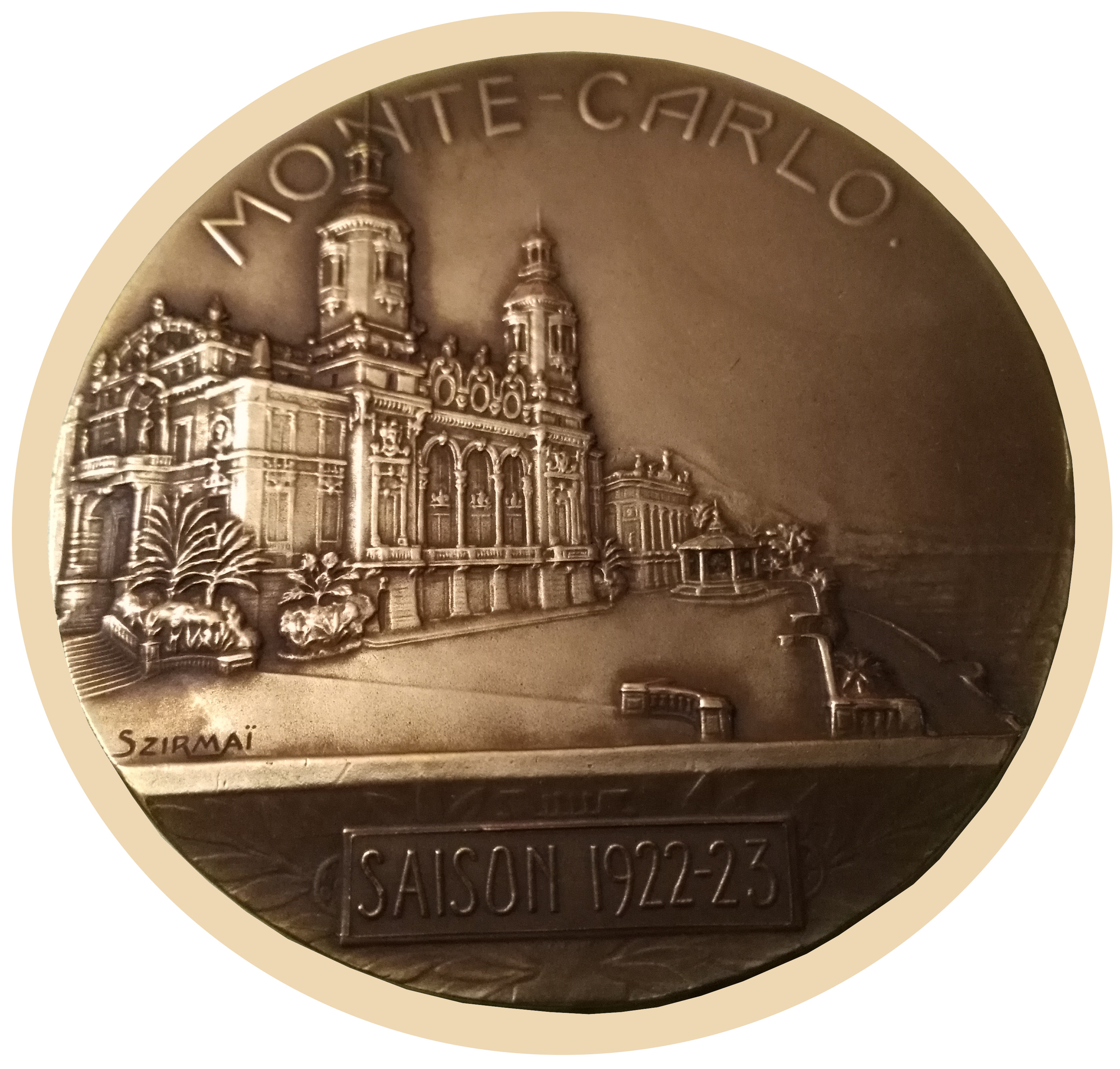
Monnet's bronze medal, 1923 (front side)

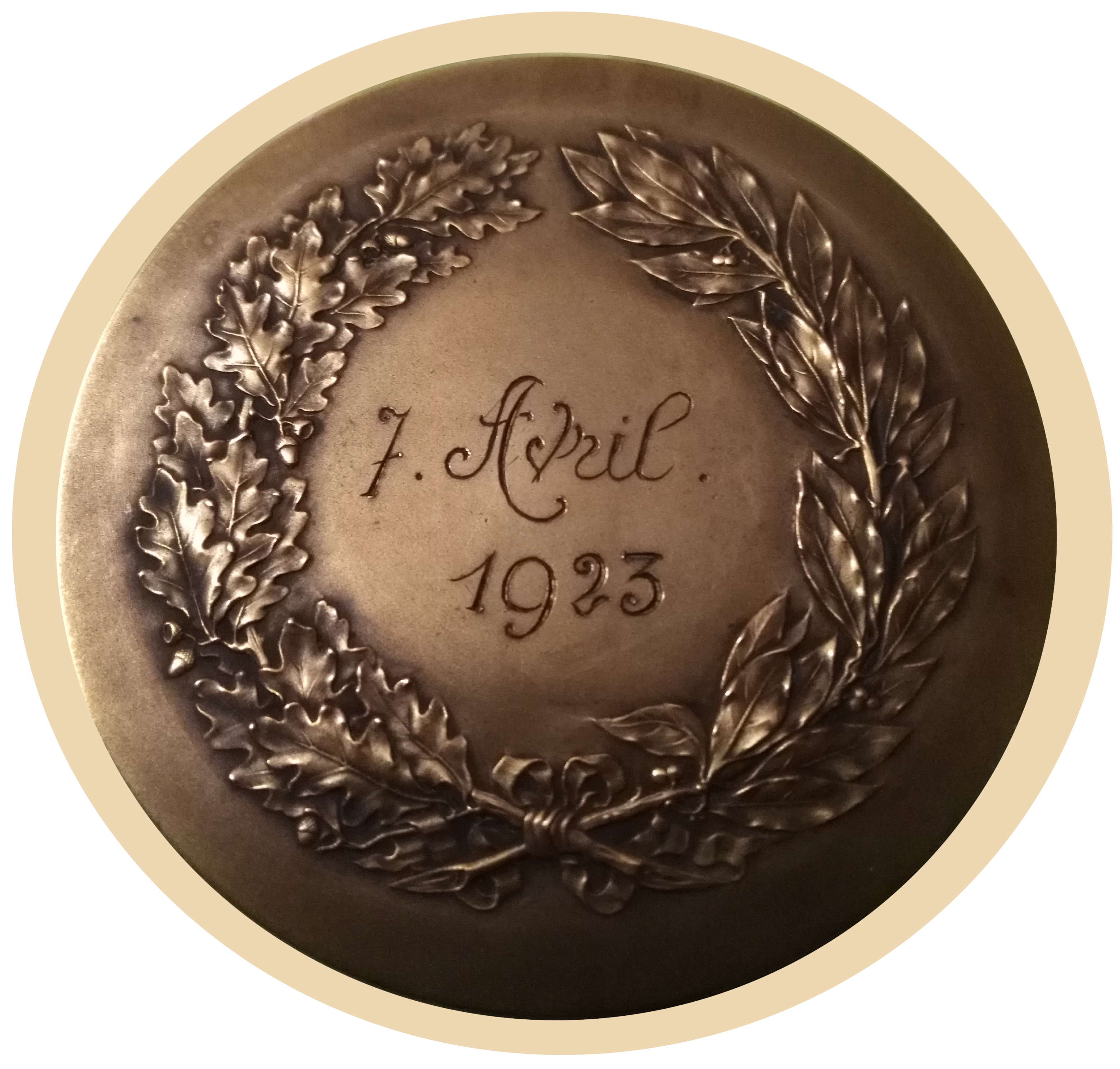
Monnet's bronze medal, 1923 (rear side)
