= Aurora (Turin) =

Coordinates: 45°04′59″N 7°41′17″E

- Neighbourhood
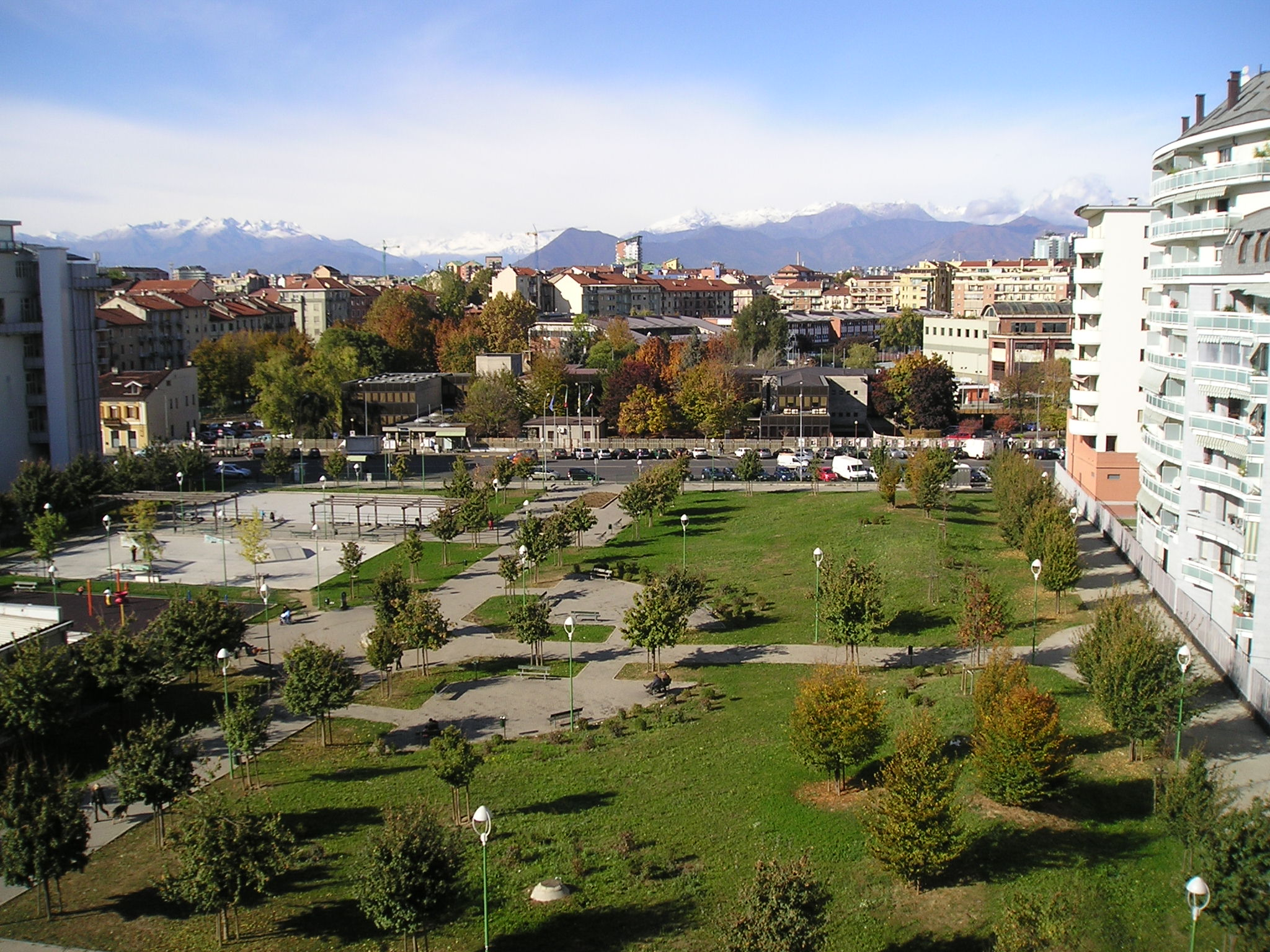
- Garden dedicated to Mother Teresa
- Interactive map of Aurora
- Country: Italy
- Region: Piedmont
- Province: Turin
- City: Turin
- Circoscrizione: Circoscrizione 7

Area
  - Total: 2.738 km^{2} (1.057 sq mi)

Population
  - Total: 41,607
  - Density: 15,200/km^{2} (39,360/sq mi)
- Postal code: 10152

Aurora is a historical district in the city of Turin, Italy. This neighborhood is divided into wards, which are distinctive one from another. The district includes:

- Porta Palazzo area, home to the biggest open-air market in Europe (Mercato di Porta Palazzo), hosted in Piazza della Repubblica;
- Borgo Dora quarter, which hosts the Sermig institution as well as flea market;
- Valdocco quarter, which hosts the Santuario di Maria Ausiliatrice (Sanctuary of Our Lady Help of Christians) and the minor basilica of the Santuario della Consolata (Sanctuary of the Virgin of Consolation).

== Gallery ==
Lavazza headquarters

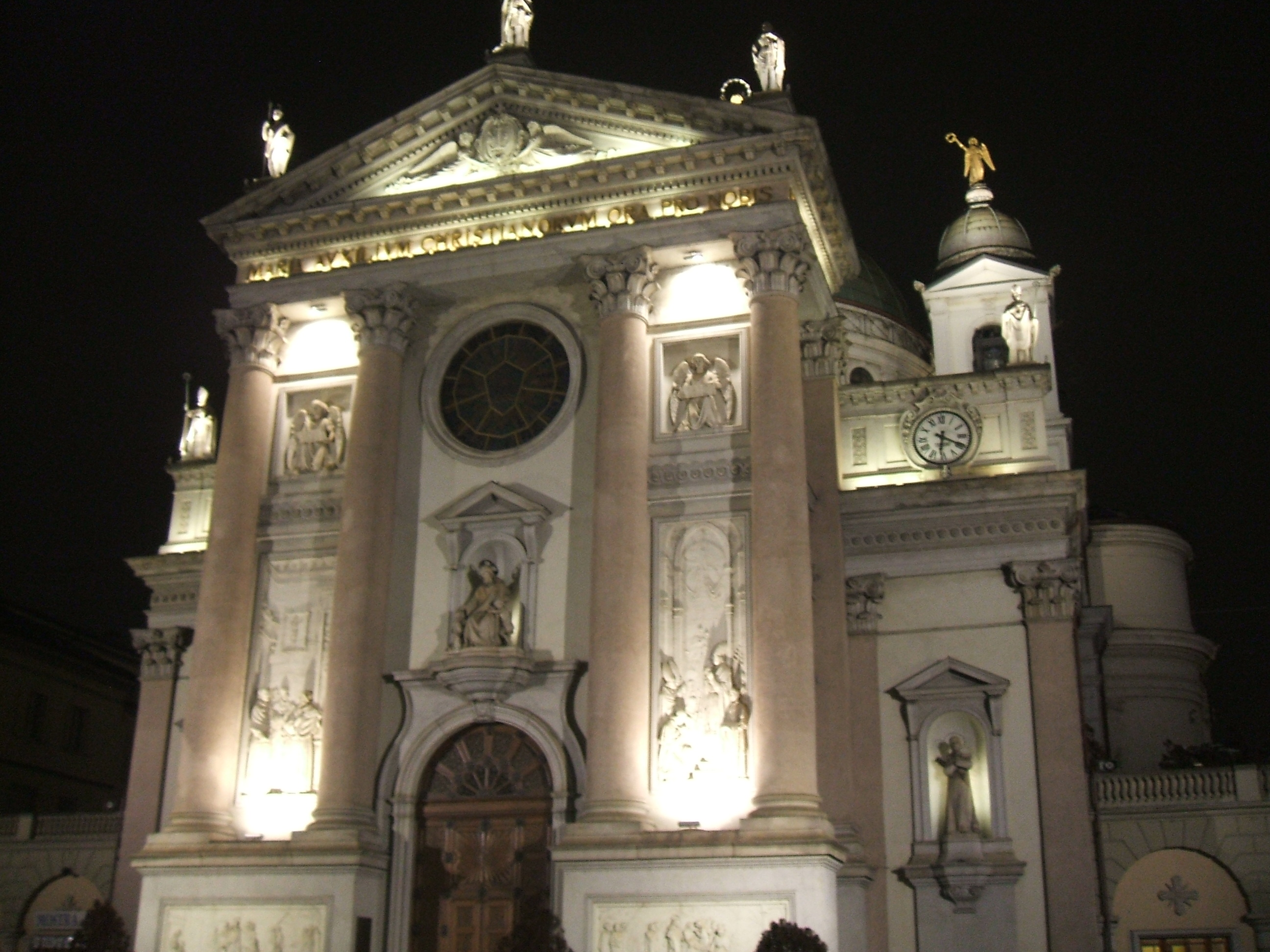
Basilica of Our Lady Help of Christians
