= Basilica of Our Lady Help of Christians =

Basilica of Our Lady Help of Christians could refer to:

- Basilica of Our Lady Help of Christians, Belmont
- Basilica of Our Lady Help of Christians, Filippsdorf
- Basilica of Our Lady Help of Christians, Shanghai
- Basilica of Our Lady Help of Christians, Turin
