= Valdocco =

Neighborhood of Turin, Piedmont, Italy

Coordinates: 45°04′59″N 7°41′17″E

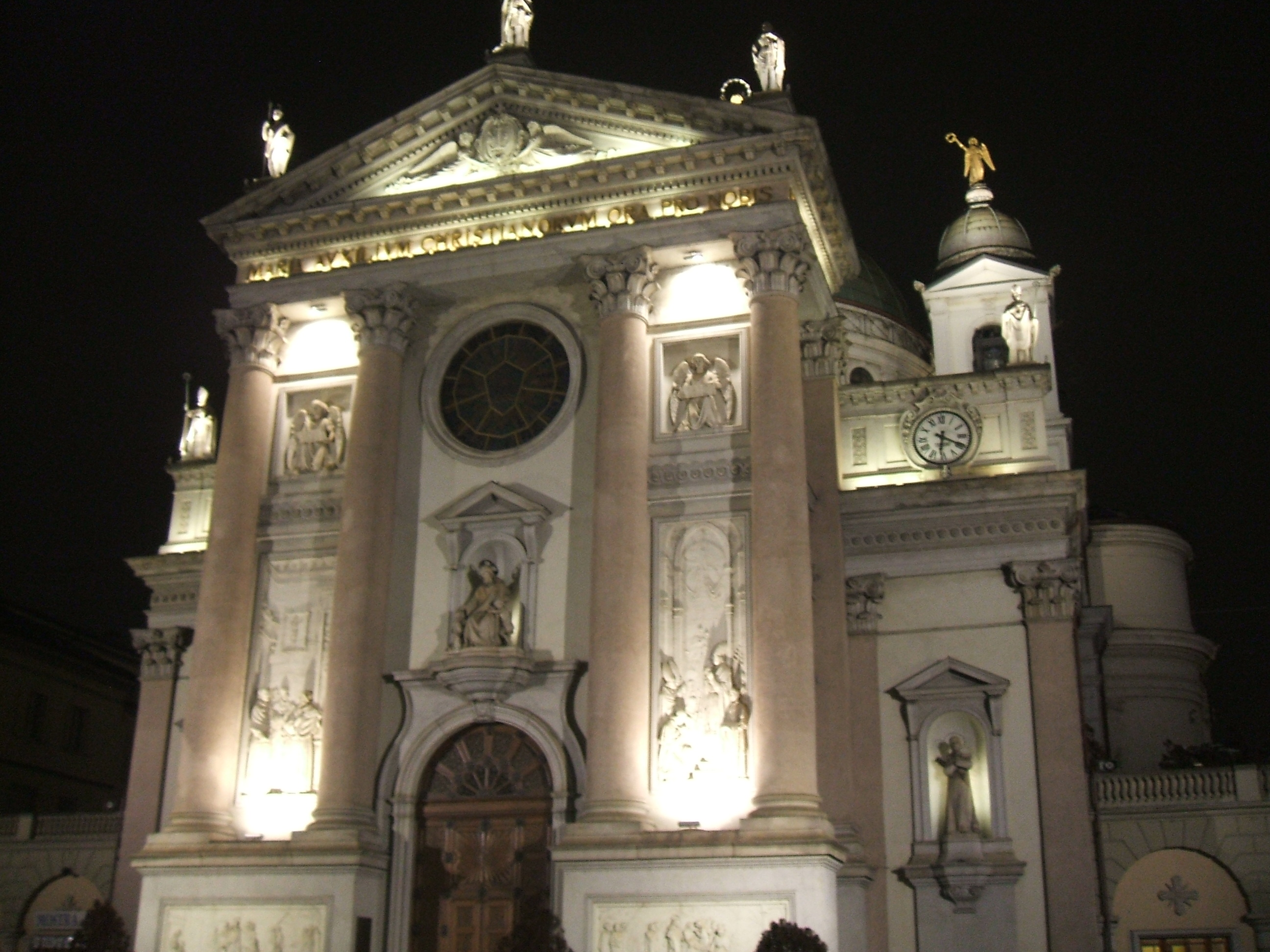
Basilica of Our Lady Help of Christians in Valdocco

Valdocco (Valdòc in Piedmontese) is a neighborhood of the city of Turin, located in the urban district Aurora. It is bordered by Corso Regina Margherita, Via Cigna, the river Dora, and the railway. The name Valdocco comes from the Latin vallis occisorum (Valley of the Slain) since several death sentences were carried out on this site.

Valdocco is known for housing one of the main centers of the Salesians of Don Bosco. The Salesian founder John Bosco, who was canonized as a saint in the Roman Catholic Church, used to visit the Pinardi's canopy, which is in this area. From here, he started his activities in favour of young people from the neighborhood. Bosco commissioned the construction of the Basilica of Our Lady Help of Christians in order to coordinate all activities related to the Salesians in the Valdocco suburb.
