= Salesian Bulletin =

The Salesian Bulletin
- Type: Monthly bulletin
- Format: Different formats for every edition
- Owner: The Salesian Congregation
- Publisher: Salesian provinces
- Editor: Salesian Family
- Founded: 1877
- Language: 29 languages
- Headquarters: In 135 countries
- Website: https://www.donbosco.press/en/

The Salesian Bulletin is an official publication of the Salesians that was founded in August 1877 by Don Bosco. It has been published without interruption since then. The purpose of the Salesian Bulletin is the proliferation of the educational works of Don Bosco all over the world. As for 2010, the Bulletin was published in 56 different editions and 29 languages for 135 countries.

== Purpose ==
The Salesian Bulletin was established by Don Bosco. It was linked initially with the foundation of the Association of Salesian Cooperators and the first Salesian missionaries in the Americas. Don Bosco intended that the Bulletin, as the official publication of the Salesian Congregation, "will link Salesians and cooperators."

== History ==
The Salesian Bulletin comes from a former experience that Don Bosco had in having his own publication. Although the researchers never found a copy, it traced a second issue by August 1875 named Bibliofilo Cattolico (The Catholic Booklover) that was printed in the Oratory Press of Don Bosco. The Catholic Booklover was dedicated to late vocations. The first editions were published in Italian, but it will be soon not just translated by edited in several languages between the 19th and 20th century.

=== Expansion ===
In August 1877, Don Bosco did a transformation of the Bibliofilo Cattolico to Monthly Salesian Bulletin (Bollettino Salesiano Mensile). The fact that Don Bosco numbered it as 5 and volume 3, proved the continuity with the Bibliofilo.

The first language was French, followed by Spanish in 1886. Don Bosco died early 1888 and the continuity of the publication passed to his successors.

Year country and language of the expansion of the Salesian Bulletin:

Country	Language	Year	Notes
Italy	Italian	1877	Founded directly by Don Bosco in Turin.
France	French	1879	
Spain	Spanish	1886	The Bulletin was distributed also in Latin America.
England	English	1892	
Germany	German	1895	
Poland	Polish	1897	
Portugal	Portuguese	1902	
Hungary	Hungarian	1903	
Slovenia	Slovenian	1907	
Lithuania	Lithuanian	1927	

=== 1878 controversy with Archbishop Gastaldi ===
In May 1878, a controversy began between Don Bosco and the Archbishop of Turin, Lawrence Gastaldi, when Gastaldi prohibited a campaign to gather funds for the construction of Saint John the Evangelist church that was made by the Salesian Bulletin in May 1878. Gastaldi saw the project of Don Bosco as opposed to the construction of other church dedicated to late Pope Pius IX. The Salesian Bulletin published an article on April, The Salesian Cooperators to the Everlasting Memory of the Great Pius IX (the Pope who died in February 1878), appealing to the charity of the Salesian cooperators to support the project.

In a letter signed by Cardinal Alexander Franchi, the Archbishop communicated to Don Bosco that he was going to build a church in honor of the deceased Pope and, therefore, "a dual appeal to Christian charity for one and the same purpose seems inadvisable".

Don Bosco answered to the Cardinal that the appeal was not for the faithful but for the Salesian cooperators and that it was published in Sampierdarena and not in Turin, being, therefore, under the authority of the Archbishop of Genoa. The answer of Don Bosco was contested by the Sacred Congregation of Bishops and Regulars where he was prohibited to continue with the project of the new church.
