= Attilio Giordani =

Italian Venerable

Venerable Attilio Giordani
- Born: 13 February 1913; Milan, Kingdom of Italy
- Died: 18 December 1972 (aged 59); Campo Grande, Mato Grosso do Sul, Brazil

Attilio Giordani A.S.C. (13 February 1913 – 18 December 1972) was an Italian Roman Catholic and member from the Association of Salesian Cooperators. Giordani studied in Milan where he encountered the Salesians of Don Bosco alongside his brother Camillo. His brother was inspired to become a priest while Giordani was inspired to become a catechist and evangelist catering to the needs of the local children and adolescents. His work at a Salesian-managed oratorio was where he would meet his future wife (whom he married in 1944) during the time he did mandated service with the Italian Armed Forces during World War II. He had three children and followed them to Brazil to do volunteer work in the missions there. His time there was short-lived as he died suffering a heart attack while giving an address to a crowd.

The process for Giordani's beatification launched in Milan (rather than Brazil, where he died, as would be the custom) in 1994, and he was titled as a Servant of God. The cause took a step forward in late 2013 after Pope Francis titled him as venerable upon confirming that Giordani had practised heroic virtue throughout his life.

== Life ==
Attilio Giordani was born in Milan on 13 February 1913 as the first of three children to Arturo Giordani and Amalia Marucco. His father was a railroad worker who each winter morning would go to bring a basket of coal to two poor old men before going to work. His mother was a housewife who suffered from frequent bouts of illness. He had two siblings: sister Angela (who became a professed religious in the Salesian Sisters of Don Bosco) and brother Camillo (b. 3.4.1923).

From 1922, he started to attend school in the Oratorio di Sant'Agostino dei Salesiani with his brother Camillo under the direction of the Salesians of Don Bosco religious congregation. Their influence prompted Camillo to pursue a path in the priesthood while inspiring Giordani to take an active role in parish initiatives and to become a catechist among adolescents like the Salesians did. Giordani was an active member in the Saint Augustine parish that the Salesians managed. He would attend his brother Camillo's ordination to the priesthood (which he received from the Cardinal Archbishop of Milan Alfredo Ildefonso Schuster) on 25 March 1950 in Milan.

He also served as a soldier in the Italian Armed Forces at intermittent periods between 23 July 1934 until 8 September 1944 just before World War II ended; he was first sent from Milan to the Greek-Albanian front before serving in other areas. He was also a worker at the Pirelli Industries in Milan around this stage. He married fellow catechist Noemi D'Avanzo on 6 May 1944 (the parish priest Pietro Lajolo presided over the marriage rite), and the pair had three children together (son Pier Giorgio in 1945 and daughters Maria Grazia in 1947 and Paola in 1952). He was a diligent catechist who was noted for his intelligence and cheerfulness and was also known to have possessed a good sense of humour when he did his catechizing and evangelizing.

Giordani also helped start the Crusade of Kindness movement in the 1950s, which received the blessing of the Cardinal Archbishop of Milan Giovanni Battista Montini (the future Pope Paul VI) and the support of the Cardinal Patriarch of Venice Angelo Giuseppe Roncalli (the future Pope John XXIII). Giordani suffered a heart attack in 1962 which forced him to suspend his usual activities for a long period of rest in Deiva Marina. His three children (Pier Giorgio had married Laura sometime in the 1960s) moved to Brazil to be volunteer missionaries in a mission that was organized in Mato Grosso do Sul under the direction of the priest Ugo De Censi. He himself – after discussing the matter with his wife – decided that the pair would join them in Brazil in 1972 to help in their work despite his ill health, which was in gradual decline. He and his wife arrived in Brazil from the Genova port (leaving on 21 June 1972) on board the ship "Giulio Cesare" in Poxoreu. He had some knowledge of the Portuguese language but did not become fluent in it. His daughters Maria Grazia and Paola returned to their homeland in October 1972 for work reasons.

He died from a heart attack on 18 December 1972 in Campo Grande. He had been speaking to a crowd of people before he felt weak and suffered a fatal heart attack. He reclined his head on the shoulder of Ugo De Censi before turning to his son, Pier Giorgio and managed to whisper to him to continue in his stead. His remains were returned home on 23 December and buried in a grave at Vendrogno, but moved later to the Basilica di Sant'Agostino in Milan (his old parish and the church the Salesians managed).

== Beatification process ==
The beatification was opened on 21 November 1994 and was closed on the diocesan level on 19 January 1996. The process saw the accumulation of documents and witness testimonies from those who knew Giordani, such as his children. The Congregation for the Causes of Saints issued the official nihil obstat ("no objections") edict and titled Giordani as a Servant of God on 22 November 1994. The Congregation issued a decree validating the diocesan investigation on 20 March 1997 and received the positio for evaluation in 2001. Giordani became titled as venerable on 9 October 2013 after Pope Francis signed a decree that acknowledged that Giordani had lived a life practising heroic virtue. The postulator for this cause is the Salesian priest Pierluigi Cameroni.
