= Basilica of Our Lady Help of Christians, Turin =

Basilica of Our Lady Help of Christians
- Basilica di Santa Maria Ausiliatrice
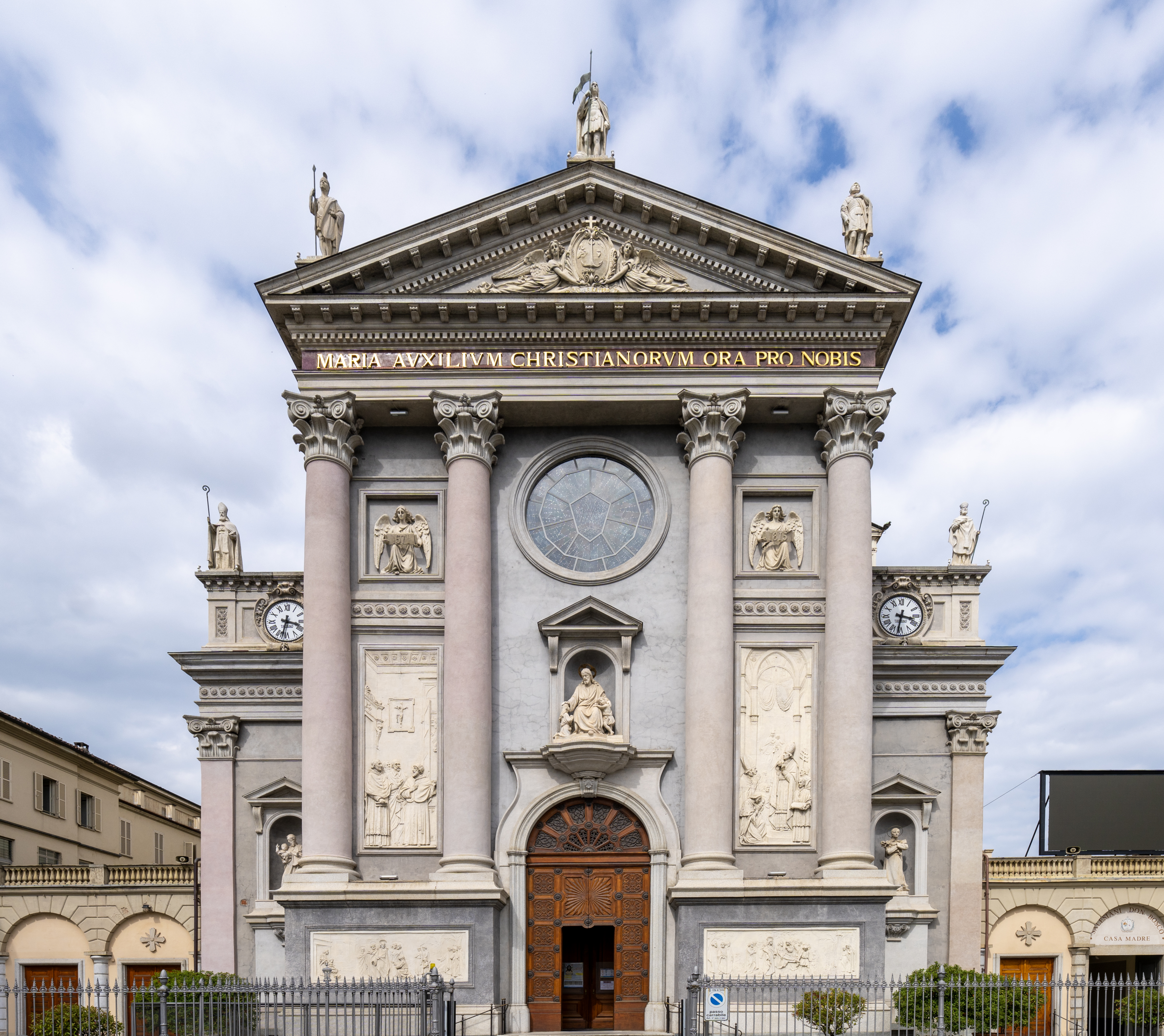
- Façade of the church

- Map of Turin
- 45.0809°N 7.6759°E
- Location: Turin
- Country: Italy
- Denomination: Roman Catholic Church

History
- Founded: 1865

Architecture
- Style: Neoclassical
- Completed: 1868

Administration
- Diocese: Turin

The Basilica of Our Lady Help of Christians (Italian: Basilica di Santa Maria Ausiliatrice) is a Pontifical church and Marian shrine in Turin, Italy. The building was originally part of the safehouse for poor boys cared for by Don Bosco; it now contains the remains of Bosco.

Pope Pius X raised the shrine to the status of Minor Basilica by the decree Anno reparatæ salutis on 12 July 1911.

== History ==
John Bosco commissioned the construction of the Basilica of Our Lady Help of Christians in order to coordinate all activities related to the Salesians in the Valdocco suburb. According to legend, a vision of the Blessed Virgin Mary appeared in a dream to Bosco in 1844 or 1845 and revealed the site of the martyrdom of the Turinese saints Solutor, Adventor and Octavius. The church was built on the site of their death and houses the relics of these saints.

The church was designed by Antonio Spezia, who drew inspiration from the facade of San Giorgio Maggiore in Venice. It was built in 1865–1868 by Carlo Buzzetti (one of the first boys of the Oratory). The first stone was laid on 27 April 1865, in the presence of Prince Amedeo di Savoia. The church was consecrated in 1868.

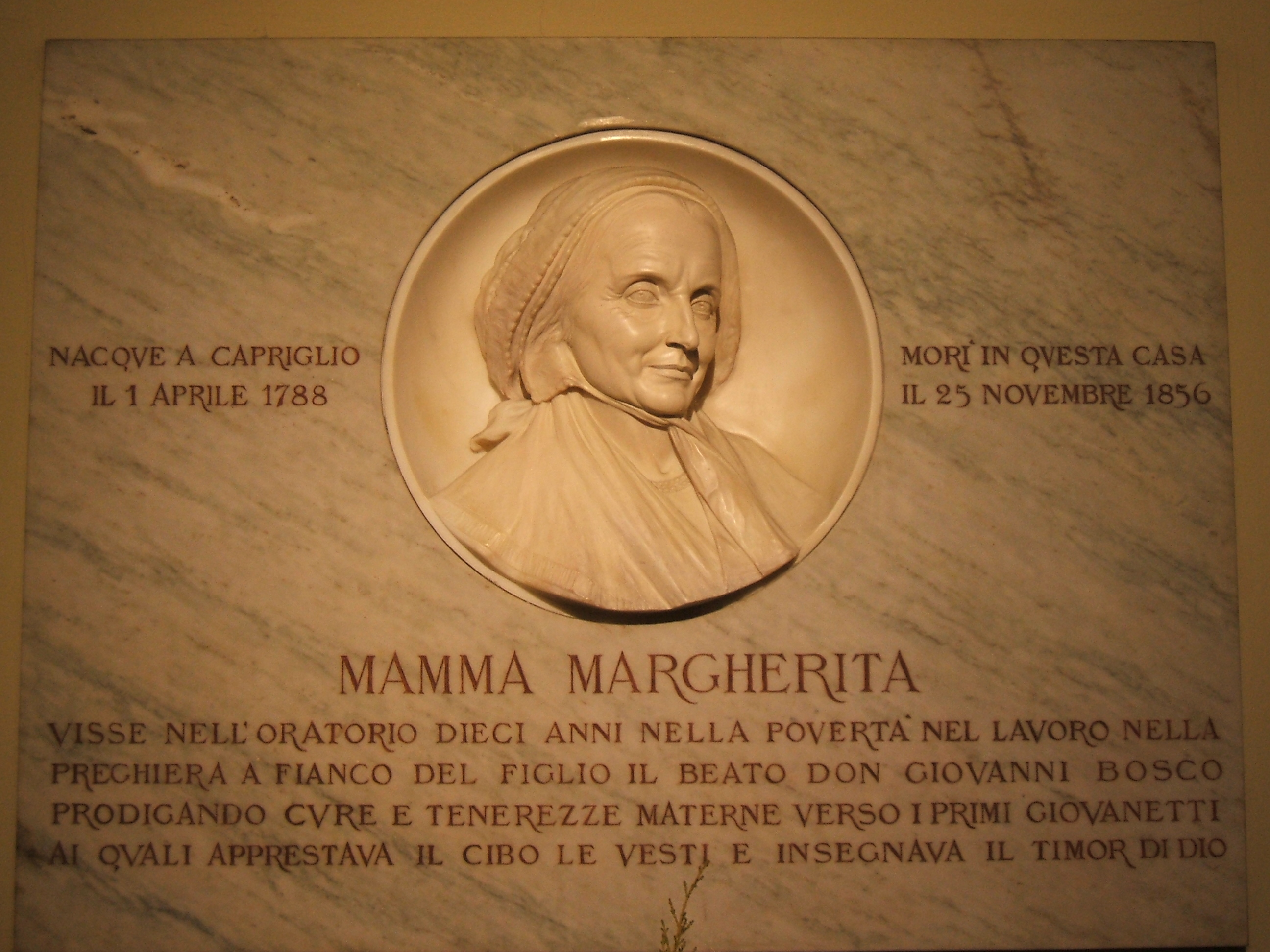
Commemorative plaque for Don Bosco's mother, Mamma Margherita

The basilica enshrines an image of the Blessed Virgin Mary under the title Mary Help of Christians. Pope Leo XIII granted a Canonical coronation to the painted image on 13 February 1903. The actual ceremony was carried out on 17 May 1903 by his Papal legate, Cardinal Agostino Richelmy.

In the nave of the basilica are the tombs of Saint John Bosco, Saint Maria Domenica Mazzarello, Saint Dominic Savio, and Saint Giuseppe Benedetto Cottolengo, as well as the tomb of John Bosco's mother Venerable Margherita Occhiena. In the crypt of the basilica are the tombs of Blessed Michele Rua, Filippo Rinaldi, and Giovanni Melchiorre Calosso. Also displayed in the crypt are six thousand numbered relics of other Catholic saints.

== See also ==
- Basilica of Our Lady Help of Christians, Belmont Abbey
- Roman Catholic Marian churches
