= Tappita District =

District in Nimba County, Liberia

Tappita District was one of six districts located in Nimba County, Liberia. The Jackson F. Doe Memorial Regional Referral Hospital opened in 2011.
