= Salesian Preventive System =

Catholic educational method

The Salesian Preventive System is the educational method of the Salesians, built upon the pedagogical experience of Saint John Bosco with poor children in 19th-century Turin. It is based on three pillars namely—reason, religion, and loving kindness which is opposed to school punishment, or what Don Bosco refers to as the repressive system of education. Don Bosco is the principal historical representative of this method of formation of the young. He was preceded in its development by such luminaries as Saint Philip Neri and Saint Francis de Sales.

Don Bosco wrote only one essay explaining his pedagogical method, The Preventive System in the Education of the Young (1877). This was included in the first Salesian Constitutions.

== History ==
The beginnings of the Salesian Preventive System can be traced to the life and apostolate of Saint John Bosco (1815–1888). During the second half of the 19th century, Don Bosco began work among poor youth in Turin, especially the homeless and orphans. In addition, the Industrial Revolution had led to a smaller proportion of poor children who would not survive until adulthood. Consequently, more living children needed guidance and direction.

Don Bosco based his pedagogy upon two preventive aspects. The first is a timely awareness of the dangers to which youths may be exposed. By this, the educators can help the youth avoid such harmful experiences in time. The second aspect is the immediate rehabilitation of youths who have already been victims of such dangers before. This is the consequential onset of bad habits, the process including sanitation therapies, empowerment of energies, and the possibility of alternative work opportunities.

Carlo Nanni defined Don Bosco as a man of action rather than a scholar. And indeed, Don Bosco did not write extensively on the matter. As such, students of the Preventive System may wish to study the life and actions of Don Bosco.

== Administration ==
This system is used widely by instructors in Don Bosco Schools and Institutes. These include such schools as Don Bosco Bandel, Don Bosco School, Park Circus, Don Bosco School (Alaknanda, New Delhi), Salesian English School, Don Bosco High & Technical School, Liluah, St. John Bosco High School, and Salesian High School (Richmond).
