= John Bosco =

Italian Roman Catholic priest, educator, & writer (1815–1888)

Saint John Bosco SDB
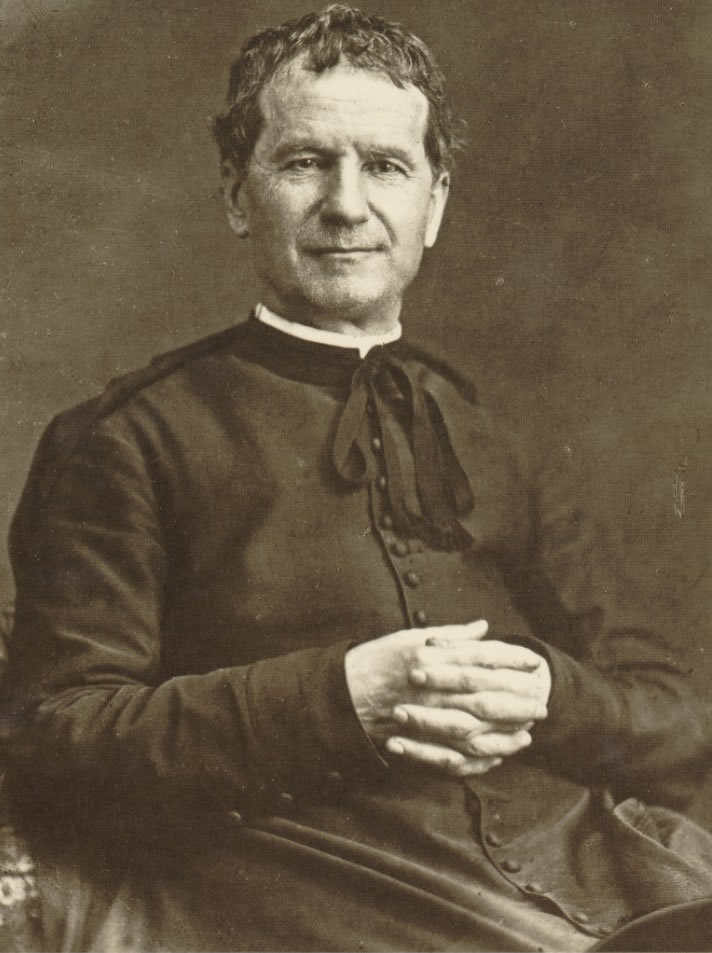
- Bosco in 1880

Priest and Confessor of the Faith "Father and Teacher of Youth"
- Born: 16 August 1815; Castelnuovo d'Asti, Piedmont, Sardinia-Piedmont
- Died: 31 January 1888 (aged 72); Turin, Kingdom of Italy
- Venerated in: Catholic Church; Anglican Communion
- Beatified: 2 June 1929, Rome by Pius XI
- Canonized: 1 April 1934, Rome by Pius XI
- Major shrine: Basilica of Our Lady Help of Christians, Turin, Italy
- Feast: 31 January
- Attributes: Cassock, Biretta
- Patronage: Christian apprentices; editors; publishers; students; young children; magicians; juvenile delinquents; Piura, Peru; Brasília, Brazil

John Melchior Bosco, SDB (Italian: Giovanni Melchiorre Bosco; Piedmontese: Gioann Melchior Bòsch; 16 August 1815 – 31 January 1888), popularly known as Don Bosco (IPA: [ˈdɔm ˈbɔsko, bo-]), was an Italian Catholic priest, educator, and writer. While working in Turin, where the population suffered many of the ill effects of industrialization and urbanization, he dedicated his life to the betterment and education of street children, juvenile delinquents, and other disadvantaged youth. He developed teaching methods based on love rather than punishment, a method that became known as the Salesian Preventive System.

As a follower of the spirituality and philosophy of Francis de Sales, Bosco was an ardent devotee of the Virgin Mary under the title Mary Help of Christians. He later dedicated his works to de Sales when he founded the Salesians of Don Bosco, based in Turin. Together with Maria Domenica Mazzarello, he founded the Institute of the Daughters of Mary Help of Christians, now commonly known as the Salesian Sisters of Don Bosco, a religious congregation of nuns dedicated to the care and education of poor girls. He taught Dominic Savio, of whom he wrote a biography that helped the young boy be canonized. He is one of the pioneers of mutual aid societies that were initiated as collaborative financial support to young migrant Catholic workers in Turin. In 1850, he drew up regulations to assist apprentices and their companions when they were involuntarily without work or fell ill.

On 18 April 1869, a year after the construction of the Basilica of Mary Help of Christians in Turin, Bosco established the Association of Mary Help of Christians (ADMA), connecting it with commitments easily fulfilled by most common people, to the spirituality and the mission of the Salesian Congregation. The ADMA was founded to promote the veneration of the Most Holy Sacrament and Mary Help of Christians.

In 1875, Bosco began to publish the Salesian Bulletin. The Bulletin has remained in continuous publication, and is published in 50 different editions and 30 languages. In 1876, he founded a lay movement, the Association of Salesian Cooperators, with the same educational mission to the poor. Bosco established a network of organizations and centres to carry on his work.

Bosco's sainthood cause was opened after his death, and following his beatification in 1929, he was canonized by Pope Pius XI in 1934.

== Life ==
John Bosco was born on 16 August 1815 in the hillside hamlet of Becchi, Italy. Becchi is in a region that was called Castelnuovo d'Asti and was later renamed Castelnuovo Don Bosco in honor of the saint. He was the youngest son of Francesco Bosco and Margherita Occhiena (1788–1856). He had two older brothers, Antonio and Giuseppe. The Boscos of Becchi were farmhands of the Moglian Family. He was born in a time of great shortage and famine in the Piedmontese countryside, following the devastation wrought by the Napoleonic Wars and drought in 1817.

When Bosco was little more than two years old, his father died, which left the support of three boys to his mother. She played a strong role in Bosco's formation and personality and was an early supporter of his ideals. In 1825, when he was nine, Bosco had the first of a series of dreams that played an influential role in his outlook and work. This first dream "left a profound impression on him for the rest of his life" according to his memoirs. Bosco apparently saw a multitude of very poor boys playing and blaspheming, when a man "appeared, nobly attired, with a manly and imposing bearing", and said to him, "You will have to win these friends of yours not with blows, but with gentleness and kindness. So begin right now to show them that sin is ugly and virtue beautiful."

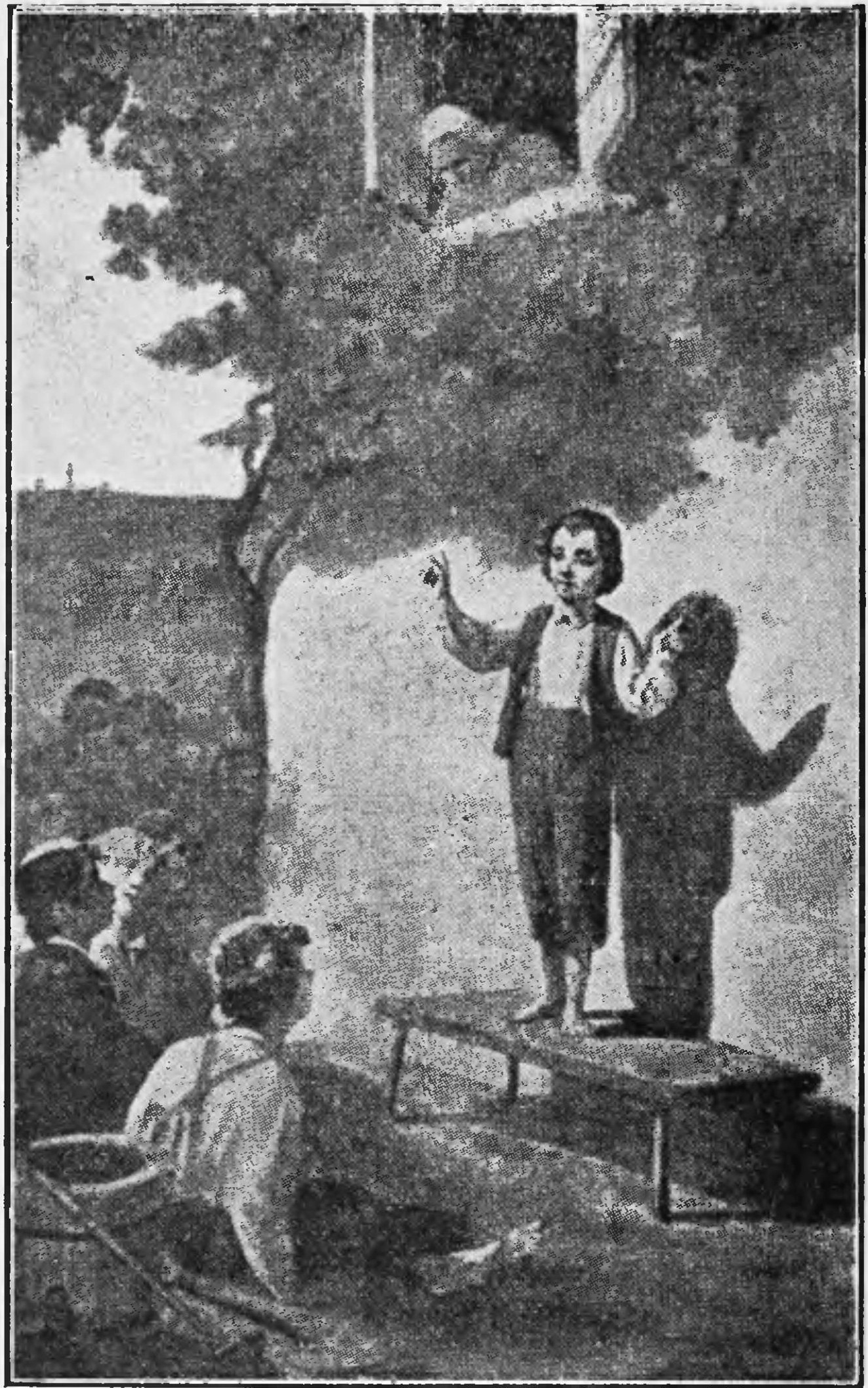
Depiction of Bosco as a little preacher repeating the Sunday Sermon

Bosco, when he was ten years old started watching his classmates' attitudes, and in every fight was the referee. The older boys were scared of him because he knew their strengths and their weaknesses. When travelling entertainers performed at a local feast in the nearby hills, he watched and studied the jugglers' tricks and the acrobats' secrets. He would then put on shows of his skills as a juggler, magician, and acrobat, with prayers before and after the performance. The money that he needed to prepare the shows was taken from selling the birds that he hunted and given to him by his mother.

Poverty prevented any serious attempt at schooling. His early years were spent as a shepherd, and he received his first instruction from Don Calosso who "was impressed by John’s memory and understanding of the sermons he had heard at a parish mission in a nearby Church." His childhood experiences are thought to have inspired him to become a priest. Being a priest was then more commonly a profession for the privileged classes than for farmers. Some biographers portray his older brother, Antonio, as the main obstacle for Bosco's ambition to study, as Antonio protested that John was just "a farmer like us!"

In February 1827, John left his home and went to look for work as a farm servant. At 12, he found life at home unbearable because of the continuous quarrels with Antonio. Having to face life by himself at such a young age may have developed his later sympathies to help abandoned boys. After begging unsuccessfully for work, he ended up at the wine farm of Louis Moglia. Although he could pursue some studies by himself, he was not able to attend school for two more years. In 1830, he met Joseph Cafasso, a young priest who identified some natural talent and supported his first schooling. Bosco's mother, Margherita, managed to earn enough money to finance his education. In 1835, Bosco entered the seminary at Chieri, next to the Church of the Immacolata Concezione. In 1841, after six years of study, he was ordained a priest on the eve of Trinity Sunday by Archbishop Franzoni of Turin. He was twenty-six years old.

=== Priesthood and first apostolates ===
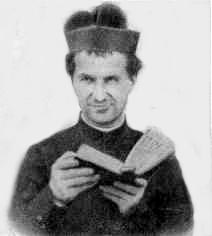
Bosco in his youth

After ordination, Bosco went to Turin, where Cafasso headed the Institute of Saint Francis of Assisi, which provided higher education for the diocesan priests. Turin then had a population of 117,000 inhabitants. The city reflected the effects of industrialization and urbanization. Numerous poor families lived in the slums of the city and had come from the countryside in search of a better life. During his studies, Bosco accompanied Cafasso in visiting the prisons and became concerned regarding the recidivism of young offenders. He began to work with orphaned and abandoned boys, teaching them catechism and helping them find work. Upon completion of his studies, Cafasso secured for Bosco an appointment as almoner of the Rifugio (Refuge), a girls' boarding school founded in Turin by the Marchioness Giulia di Barolo, so that he could remain in Turin. His other ministries included visiting prisoners, teaching catechism, and helping out at many country parishes.

In the seminary, he learned practical trades including carpentry, farming, cooking, and shoemaking, which he later used to educate poor boys.

Because of population growth and migration to the city, Bosco found the traditional methods of parish ministry to be inefficient. He decided that it was necessary to try another form of apostolate, and he began to meet the boys where they worked and gathered in shops and marketplaces. They were pavers, stonecutters, masons, and plasterers who had come from far away, as he recalled in his brief Memoires.

The Oratorio was not simply a charitable institution, and its activities were not limited to Sundays. For Don Bosco, it became his permanent occupation. He looked for jobs for the unemployed. Some of the boys did not have sleeping quarters and slept under bridges or in bleak public dormitories. Twice, he tried to provide lodgings in his house. The first time, they stole the blankets; the second, time, they emptied the hayloft. He did not give up, and in May 1847, he gave shelter to a young boy from Valencia in one of the three rooms he was renting in the slums of Valdocco, where he was living with his mother. He and his mother began taking in orphans. The boys sheltered by Don Bosco numbered 36 in 1852, 115 in 1854, 470 in 1860, and 600 in 1861, reaching a maximum of 800 sometime later.

Bosco and his oratory moved around town for several years; he was turned out of several places in succession. After only two months based in the church of St. Martin, the entire neighbourhood expressed its annoyance with the noise coming from the boys at play. A formal complaint was lodged against them with the municipality. Rumours also circulated that the meetings conducted by the priest with his boys were dangerous; their recreation could be turned into a revolution against the government. The group was evicted.

=== Work with apprentices ===
In the archives of the Salesian Congregation is a contract of apprenticeship, dated November 1851; another one on stamped paper costing 40 cents, dated 8 February 1852; and others have later dates. They are among the first contracts of apprenticeship to be found in Turin. All of them are signed by the employer, the apprentice, and Don Bosco. In those contracts, Don Bosco touched on many sensitive issues. Some employers customarily made servants and scullery boys of the apprentices. Don Bosco obliged them to agree to employ the boys only in their acknowledged trade. Employers used to beat the boys, and Don Bosco required them to agree that corrections be made only verbally. He cared for their health and demanded that they be given rest on feast days and an annual holiday. Despite all the efforts and contracts, the situation of the apprentices of the time remained difficult.

One influential friend was the Piedmontese justice minister Urbano Rattazzi. He was anticlerical in his politics but saw some value in Bosco's work. While Rattazzi was pushing a bill through the Sardinian legislature to suppress religious orders, he advised Bosco on how to get around the law. He found a religious order to keep the oratory going after its founder's death. Bosco had been thinking about that problem too and had been slowly organizing his helpers into a loose Congregation of St. Francis de Sales. He was also training select older boys for the priesthood. Another supporter of the idea of establishing a religious order to carry out Bosco's vision was the reigning pope, Pope Pius IX.

Bosco disliked the ideals that had been exported by Revolutionary France, as part of the process of dechristianization of France during the French Revolution, and called Rousseau and Voltaire "two vicious leaders of incredulity". He favoured an ultramontane view of politics that acknowledged the supreme authority of the pope. In 1854, when the Sardinia-Piedmont was about to pass a law suppressing monastic orders and confiscating ecclesiastical properties, Bosco reported a series of dreams about "great funerals at court" that referred to politicians or members of the Savoy court.

In November 1854, Bosco wrote to King Victor Emmanuel II admonishing him to oppose the confiscation of church property and suppression of the orders; his letter went unanswered. His actions, which had been described by the Italian historian Roberto Petoia as having "manifest blackmailing intentions", ended only after the intervention of the then prime minister, Camillo Benso, Count of Cavour. The king's family suffered several deaths in a short period. From January to May 1855, the king's mother Maria Theresa of Austria (aged 54), his wife Adelaide of Austria (aged 32), their newborn son Vittorio Emanuele, Count of Genoa (nearly four months old), and his only brother, Prince Ferdinando, Duke of Genoa (aged 32), all died.

Opposition to Bosco and his work came from various quarters. Traditionalist clergy accused him of stealing the young and old people away from their own parishes. Nationalist politicians, including some clergy, saw his several hundred young men as a recruiting ground for revolution. The Marquis de Cavour, the chief of police in Turin, regarded the open-air catechisms as overtly political and a threat to the state and was highly suspicious of Bosco's support for the powers of the papacy. Bosco was interrogated on several occasions; no charges were made. Closure may have been prevented by orders from the king that Bosco was not to be disturbed. Several attempts were also made on Bosco's life, including a near-stabbing, bludgeoning, and a shooting. Early biographers put that down to the growing influence of the Waldensians in opposition to Catholic clergy.

=== Foundation of Salesians of Don Bosco ===
Some of the boys helped by Don Bosco decided to do what he was doing: work in the service of abandoned boys. That was the origin of the Salesian Congregation. Among the first members were Michael Rua, John Cagliero (who later became a Cardinal), and John Baptist Francesca. In 1857 Bosco drew up a set of rules for his helpers. This rule was approved definitively in 1873 by Pope Pius IX as the Rule of the Society of Saint Francis de Sales.

In 1859, Bosco selected the experienced priest Vittorio Alasonatti, 15 seminarians, and one high school boy and formed them into the Society of St. Francis de Sales. That was the nucleus of the Salesians, the religious order that would carry on his work. When the group had its next meeting, it voted on the admission of Joseph Rossi as a lay member, the first Salesian brother. The Salesian Congregation was divided into priests, seminarians, and coadjutors (the lay brothers).

Bosco then worked with Mary Mazzarello and a group of girls in the hill town of Mornese. In 1871, he founded a group of religious sisters to do for girls what the Salesians were doing for boys. They were called the Daughters of Mary Help of Christians. In 1874, he founded yet another group, the Salesian Cooperators, who were mostly lay people who would work for young people like the Daughters and the Salesians but would not join a religious order. The first Salesians departed for Argentina in 1875. After his ordination, Bosco himself would have become a missionary if his director, Joseph Cafasso, had not opposed the idea. Bosco nevertheless eagerly read the Italian edition of the Annals of the Propagation of the Faith and used this magazine to illustrate his Cattolico Provveduto (1853) and his Month of May booklets (1858).

When Bosco founded the Salesian Society, the thought of the missions still obsessed him but completely lacked the financial means. For three years he collected information about different countries. A request from Argentina turned him towards the Indians of Patagonia, and a study of its people convinced him that the country and its inhabitants were the ones that he had seen in his dream. In late 1874, Bosco received letters from the Argentine consul at Savona requesting that he accept an Italian parish in Buenos Aires and a school for boys at San Nicolas de Los Arroyos.

Bosco regarded it as a sign of Providence and started to prepare a mission. Adopting a way of evangelization that would not expose his missionaries to wild, uncivilized tribes, he proposed setting up bases in safe locations at which missionary efforts were to be launched. Negotiations started after Archbishop Aneiros of Buenos Aires had indicated that he would be glad to receive the Salesians. In a ceremony held on 29 January 1875, Bosco was able to convey the great news to the oratory. On 5 February, he announced the fact in a circular letter to all Salesians asking volunteers to apply in writing. He proposed for the first missionary departure to start in October. There were many volunteers.

=== Salesian Preventive System and other works ===
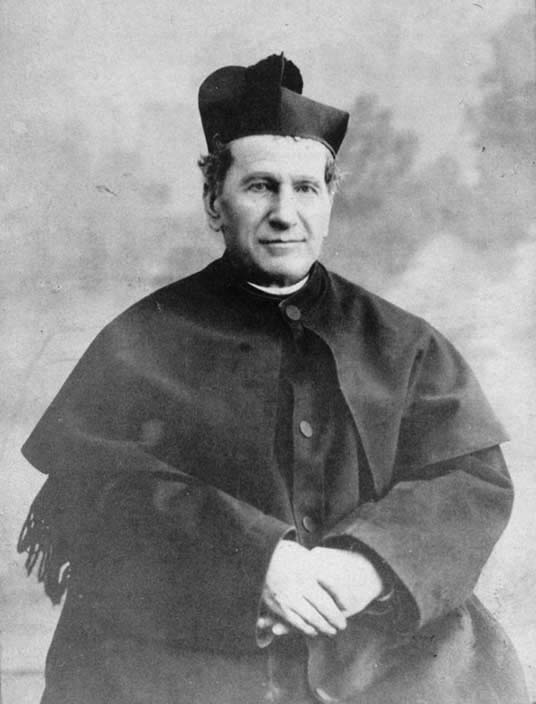
Photograph of Bosco, c. 1887

In the years that Bosco had spent running his oratory and giving spiritual and practical instruction to the boys he had housed there, he relied on a different approach to education and general instruction, which he believed to be superior to traditional educational methods, such as school discipline, which he labelled as a repressive system of education. On 12 March 1877, Bosco gave an opening address on the systems of education during the day for the opening of the St. Peter's Youth Center in the new quarters of the Patronage de Saint Pierre in Nice in which he first mentioned the term "Preventive System".

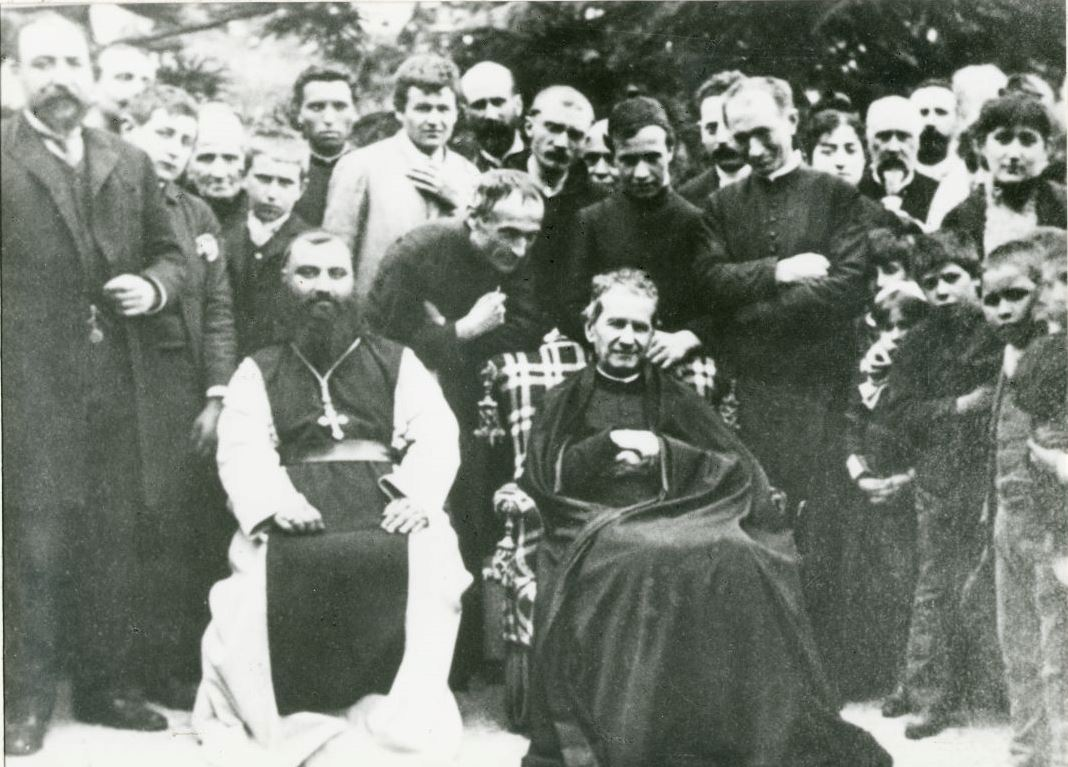
Bosco (sitting at right) during a visit to Barcelona in 1886

Upon his return to Turin, Bosco wrote down the address as a polished essay under the title The Preventive System in the Education of the Youth, which was published in 1877 and in which he included in the initial draft of the Rule for the Salesian Order. It espoused the values of reason, religion, and loving kindness with a goal of producing "good Christians and honest citizens". That was one type of Bosco's systematic exposition of his educational system. His preferred way to explain his educational approach was through educational novels and narrative pedagogy. Though some of the ideas were not innovative, Bosco having drawn the inspiration for his system through the contemporary criticisms of the punitive and outdated educational systems prevalent in Europe during his time, and he was one of the first to combat it and to put his criticisms into practice.

Though Bosco's written works were little known outside of his own order and the subscribers of his Salesian Bulletin, which he founded in 1877, he wrote frequently and voluminously. He was described as more of a man of action than a scholar, but wrote, adapted, and published many works on religion, history, catechesis and the Church. The full list of his publications is available at salesian.online. He penned the 1881 A Compendium of Italian History from the Fall of the Roman Empire, which was translated and updated by John Daniel Morell and noted by scholars for its cultural importance on the knowledge base of ancient to modern civilization. He was also a skilled biographer. His two best-known biographies were of his mentor, Joseph Cafasso, and one of his students, Dominic Savio, which was instrumental in his canonization.

== Works ==
Following are Bosco's works in roughly chronological order.

Essays published in the volumes of Catholic Readings (Letture Cattoliche), 1853–1884

- 1853
  - ”Announcements for Catholics”
  - “The Instructed Catholic”
  - “Historical Notes on the Miracle of the Blessed Sacrament at Turin”
  - “Fact of Our Times”
  - “A Dispute Between a Lawyer and a Protestant Minister”
  - “Notes on the Life of the Youth Luigi Comollo”
  - “The Conversion of a Waldensian”
  - “A Collection of Strange Contemporary Happenings”
  - “The Six Sundays in Honour of St. Aloysius Gonzaga”
  - “The Jubilee”
- 1855
  - “An Easy Method of Learning Sacred History”
  - “Talks on Confession”
  - “Life of St. Martin, Bishop of Tours”
  - “The Value of a Good Upbringing”
- 1856
  - “Life of St. Pancras”
- 1857
  - “Life of St. Peter”
  - “Two Conferences on Purgatory”
  - “Life of St. Paul”
  - “Lives of the Sovereign Pontiffs Linus, Cletus, and Clement”
  - “Lives of the Sovereign Pontiffs Anacletus, Evaristus, and Alexander I”
  - “Lives of the Sovereign Pontiffs Sixtus, Telesphorus, and Hyginus”
- 1858
  - “Lives of the Sovereign Pontiffs Anicetus, Soter, Eleutherus, Victor, and Zephirinus”
  - “The Month of May, Consecrated to Mary Immaculate”
  - “The Christian’s ‘Porta Tecum’”
  - “Life of the Sovereign Pontiff Callistus I”
- 1859
  - “Life of the Youth Dominic Savio”
  - “Life of the Sovereign Pontiff Urban I”
  - “Lives of the Sovereign Pontiffs Pontian, Anteros, and Fabian”
  - “The Persecution of Decius and the Pontificate of St. Cornelius I”
- 1860
  - “Lives of the Sovereign Pontiffs St. Lucian I and St. Stephen I”
  - “The Pontificate of St. Sixtus II and the Glories of St. Laurence”
  - “Biography of Fr. Joseph Cafasso”
- 1861
  - “A Family of Martyrs”
  - “Biographical Note on Michael Magone”
  - “The Pontificate of St. Dionysius”
  - “Biography of Silvio Pellico”
- 1862
  - “The Pontificates of St. Felix I and St. Eutychian”
  - “The New Charm of an Old Soldier of Napoleon”
- 1863
  - “Historical Notes on BI. Catherine De-Mattei”
  - “The Pontificate of St. Caius”
- 1864
  - “The Pontificates of SS. Marcellinus and Marcellus”
  - “Episodes Pleasant and Contemporary”
  - “The Little Shepherd of the alps”
- 1865
  - “The House of Fortune”
  - “Dialogues on the Jubilee”
  - “The Peace of the Church”
  - “Life of Bl. Mary of the Angels, C.S.”
- 1866
  - “Valentine or the Opposed Vocation”
- 1867
  - “The Centenary of St. Peter the apostle”
  - “Life of St. Joseph”
  - “News and Stories”
- 1868
  - “Severino, or the adventures of a Young alpinist”
  - “Marvels of the Mother of God”
  - “Life of St. John the Baptist”
  - “Remembrance of a Solemnity”
- 1869
  - “The Catholic Church and Its Hierarchy”
  - “Association of the Devotees of Mary, Help of Christians”
  - “The General Councils and the Catholic Church”
  - “Angelina, or the Little Orphan Girl of the Apennines”
- 1870
  - “Nine Days Consecrated to the august Mother of Our Saviour”
  - “Church History”
- 1871
  - “The Apparition of the Blessed Virgin at La Salette”
  - “Pleasing Facts From the Life of Pius IX”
- 1872
  - “The Centenary of St. Eusebius the Great”
- 1874
  - “Massimino, or the Encounter of a Boy with a Protestant”
- 1875
  - “The Jubilee of 1875”
  - “Mary, Help of Christians”
- 1877
  - “The Little Cloud of Carmel”
- 1878
  - “The Loveliest Flower of the Apostolic College”
- 1883
  - “The Catholic in the World"
- 1884
  - “New Stories of Luigi Comolli”

Series started by Don Bosco

- The Friend of Youth, a politico-religious paper (1849)
  - 1851
    - Synoptic tablet (on the Catholic Church)
    - Flying leaflets
- Il Galantuomo. A national almanac began (1854)
- Salesian Bulletin (since 1877)

Critical works

- Forty Dreams of St. John Bosco (critical edition published in 1977, originally published as a dream journal in 1855)
- The Preventive System in the Education of the Youth (1877)
- A Compendium of Italian History from the Fall of the Roman Empire (1881)

Posthumous works

- Memoirs of the Oratory of Saint Francis de Sales (written between 1815 and 1855, published posthumously in 1989)
- The Spiritual Writings of Saint John Bosco (1984)
- Dreams, Visions, and Prophecies of Don Bosco (1999)
- The Unpublished Don Bosco (compiled by Mario Balbi and published in 2005)

== Death and canonization ==
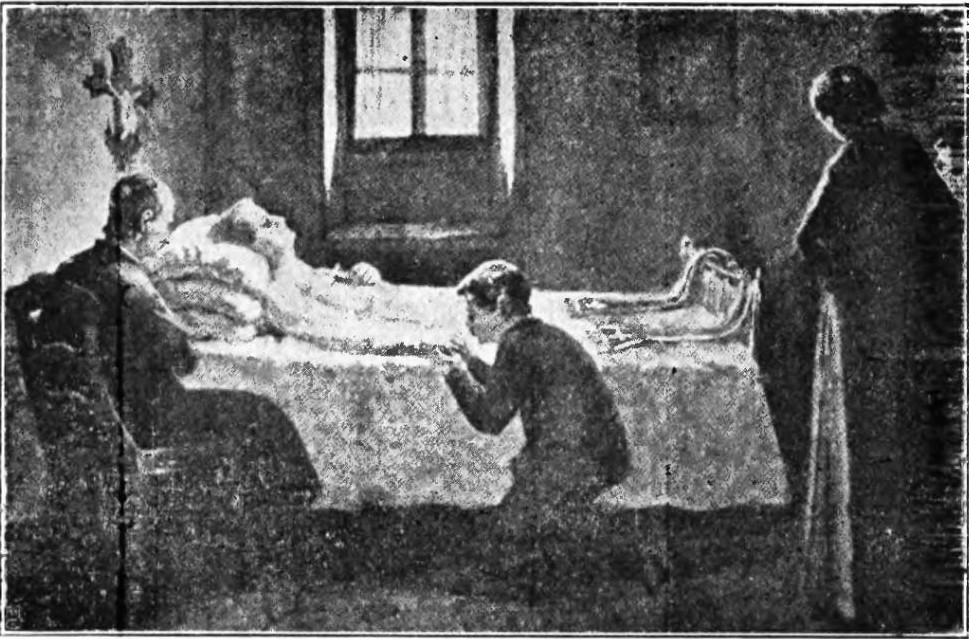
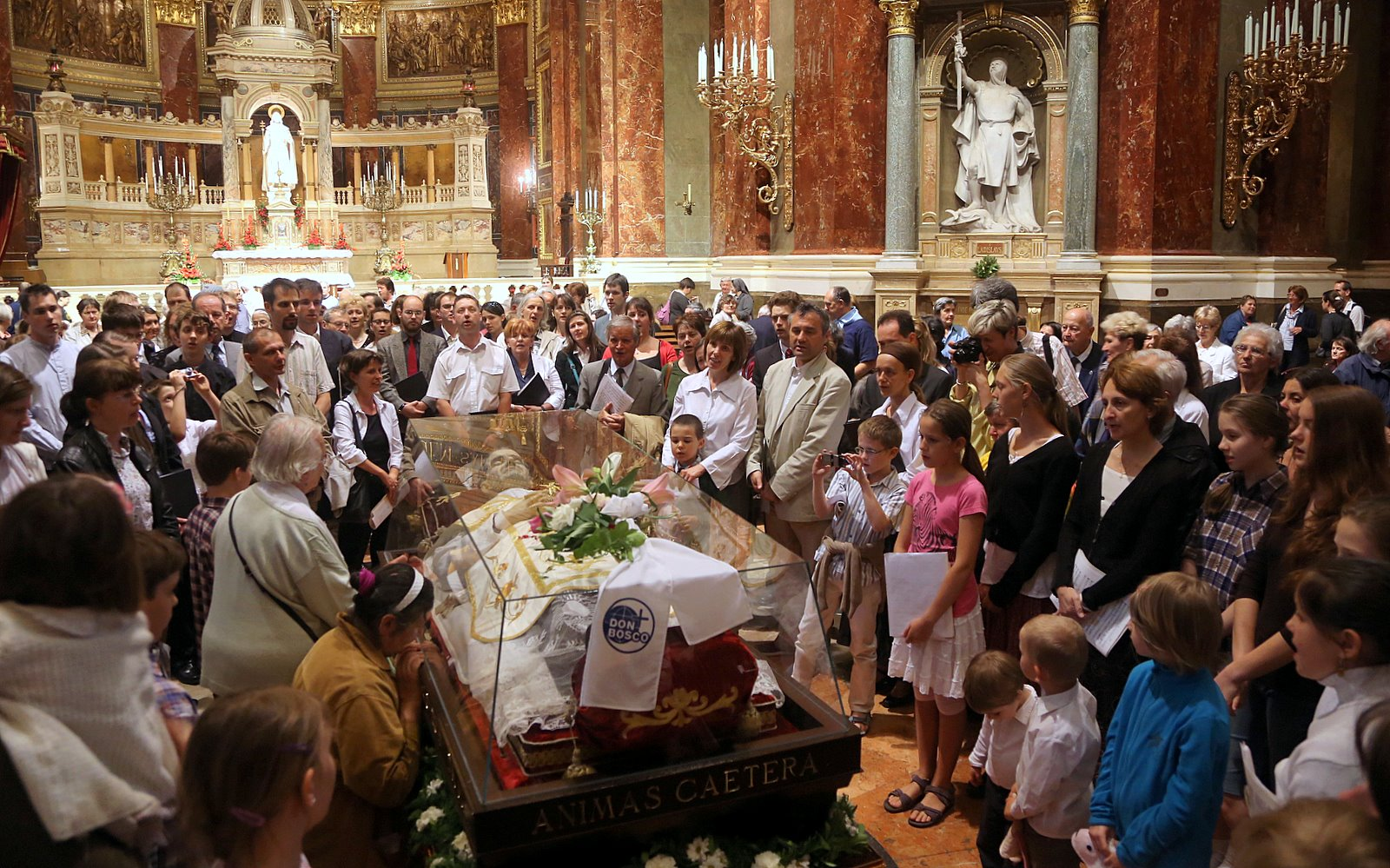
(left): As Don Bosco lay dying, all begged to see him and kiss his hand for the last time, image from The Venerable Don Bosco book (1916); (right): Don Bosco's relic in the Saint Stephen's Basilica in Budapest, 2013

Bosco died on 31 January 1888. His funeral was attended by thousands.

The Archdiocese of Turin investigated, and witnesses were called to determine if Bosco was worthy to be declared a saint. The Salesians, Daughters, and Cooperators gave supportive testimonies. Pope Pius XI had known Bosco and pushed the cause forward. Pius XI beatified Bosco on 2 June 1929 and canonised him on Easter Sunday (1 April) 1934, when he was given the title of "Father and Teacher of Youth". Pope Pius XII proclaimed him patron saint of Catholic publishers in 1949. His repertoire of writings and publications consists of over 220 titles collected in 38 volumes. They were printed at his own peerless paper-to-print workshop, where boys learned the art of printing and publishing in view of future employment.

Bosco had been popularly known as the patron saint of illusionists. On 30 January 2002, Silvio Mantelli petitioned Pope John Paul II to declare Bosco formally to the patron of stage magicians. Catholic stage magicians who practice gospel magic venerate Bosco by offering free magic shows to underprivileged children on his feast day. Bosco's work was carried on by an early pupil, collaborator, and companion, Michael Rua, who was appointed rector major of the Salesian Society by Pope Leo XIII in 1888. He is remembered in the Church of England with a commemoration on 31 January.

== In popular culture ==
Bosco was the subject of the 1935 Italian biopic film Don Bosco, directed by Goffredo Alessandrini, with Gian Paolo Rosmino playing Bosco. He was also the subject of Don Bosco (1988), Johnny (1993), Saint John Bosco: Mission to Love (2004) and Maìn - La casa della felicità (Maìn - The House of Happiness) (2012).

== Monuments and memorials to Bosco ==
Bosco is the patron saint of Brasília, which he supposedly foresaw in a dream about an extraordinary new civilization in central Brazil. Many educational institutions are named after him, in countries as diverse as Australia, Belgium, Canada, Colombia, India, the Philippines, Pakistan, Lebanon and the United States. Several institutions in Engadine, New South Wales, were also named for Bosco, including St John Bosco Parish, St John Bosco Primary School, and St John Bosco College. The Church of Saint-Jean-Bosco in Paris, France, is also named for him.

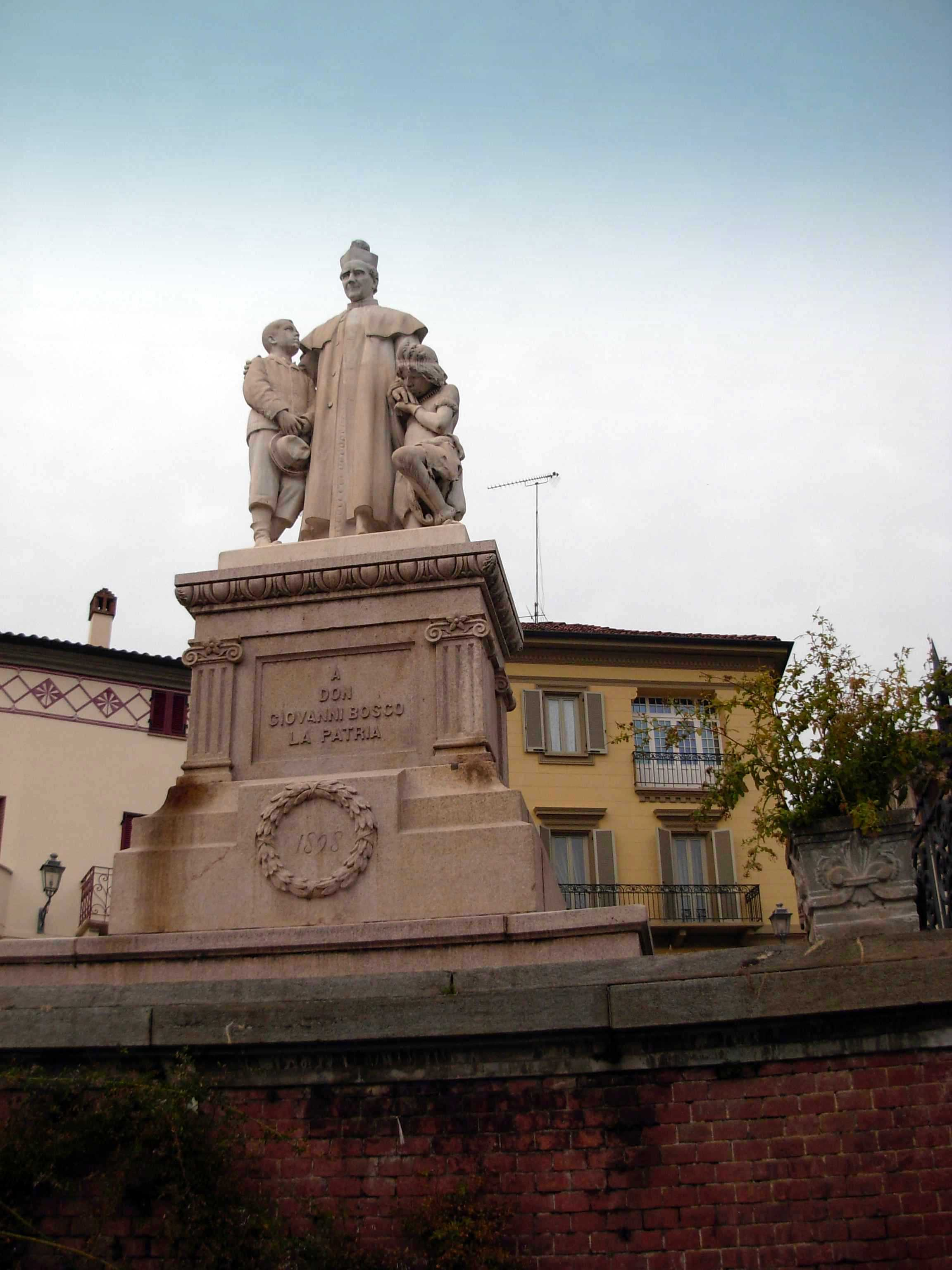
Monument in Castelnuovo, Italy

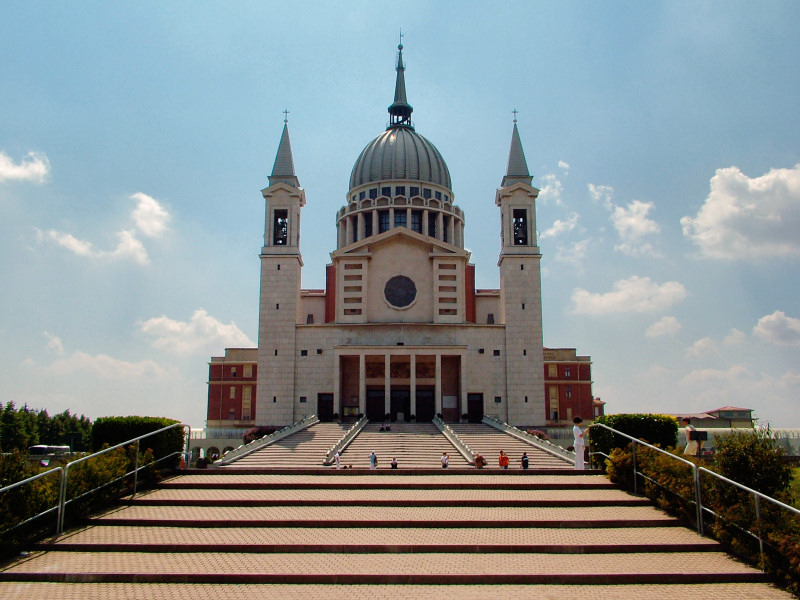
Basilica Don Bosco in Castelnuovo Don Bosco, Italy

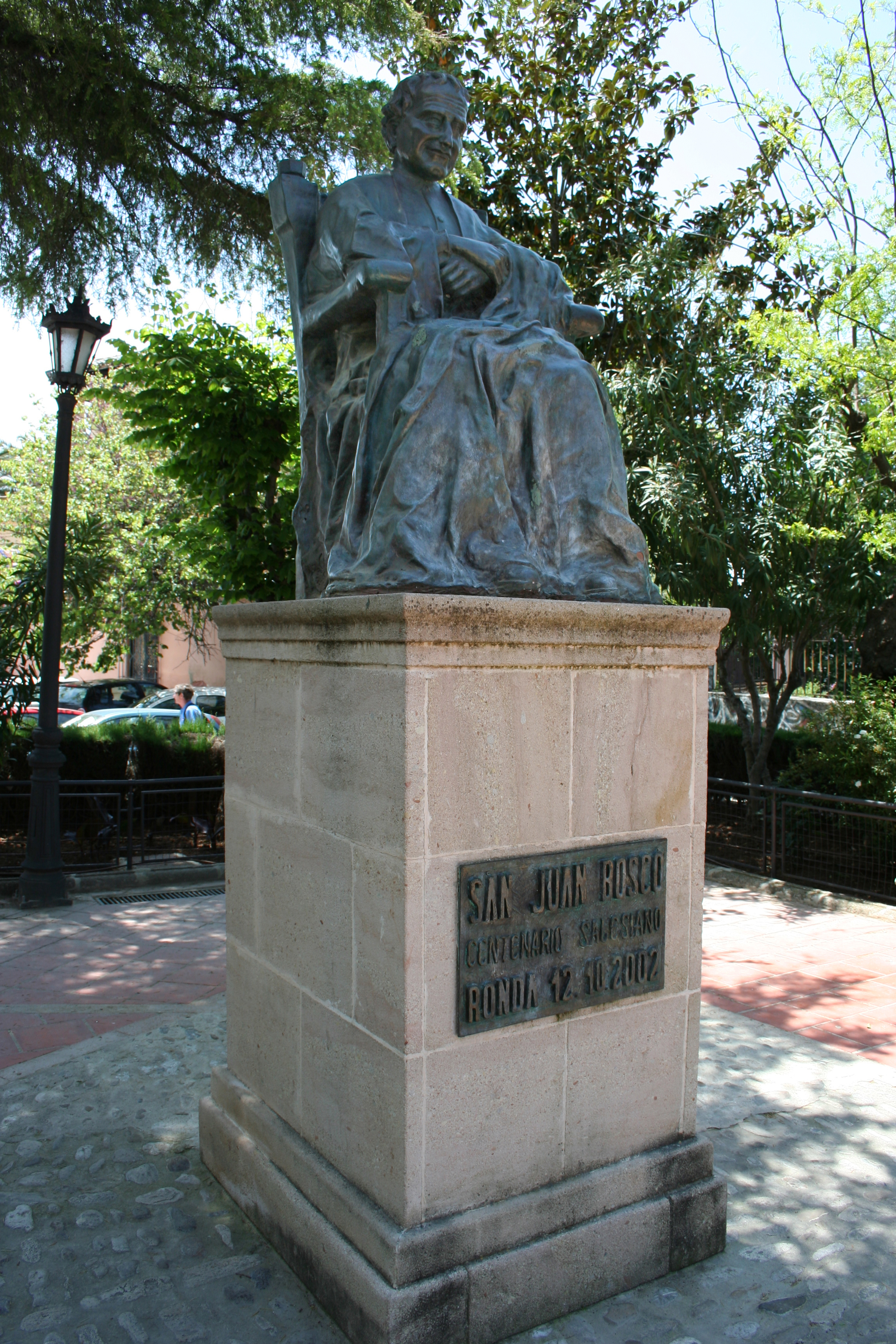
Statue of Saint John Bosco, Ronda, Spain

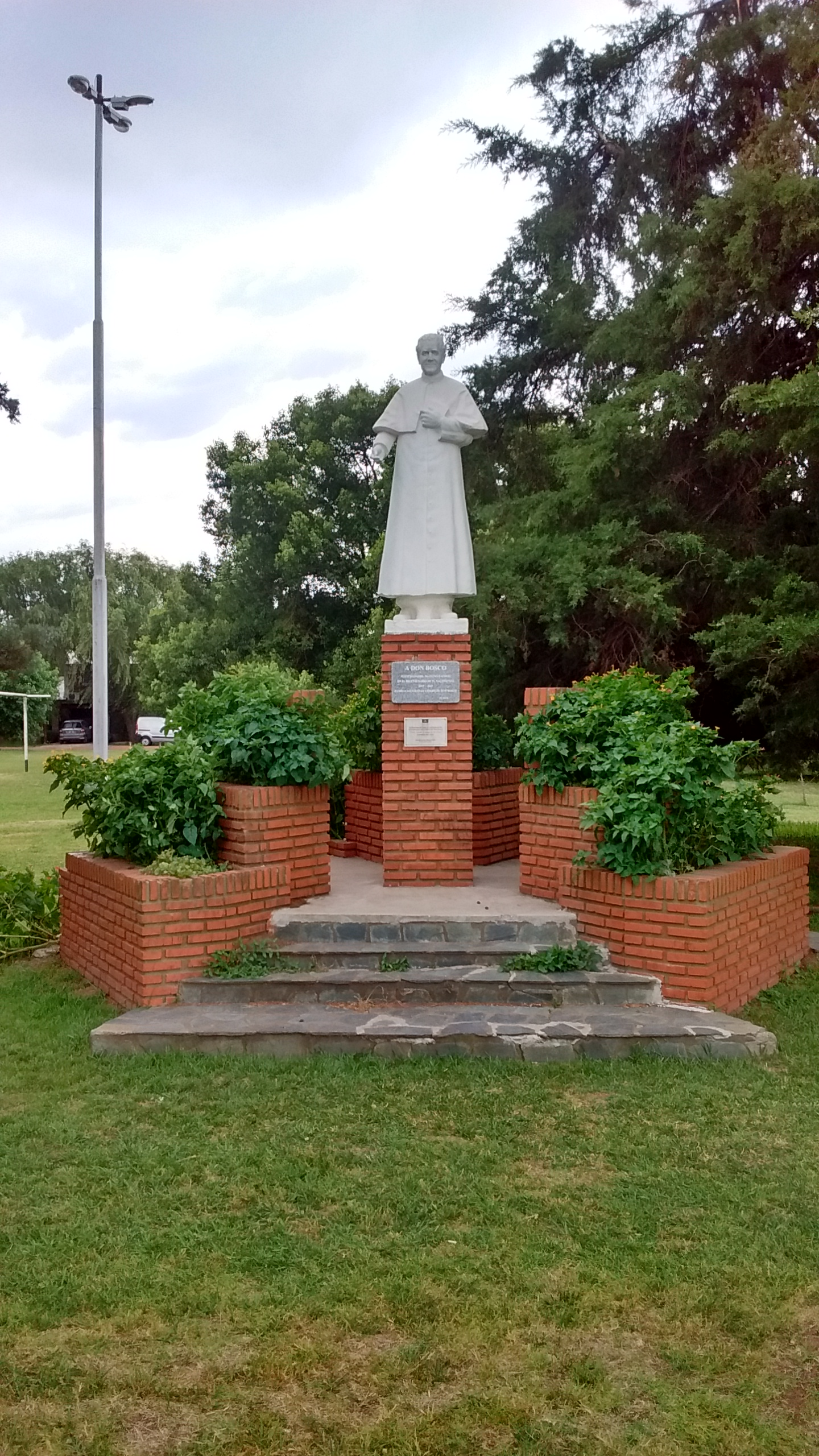
Monument in Funes, Santa Fe, Argentina

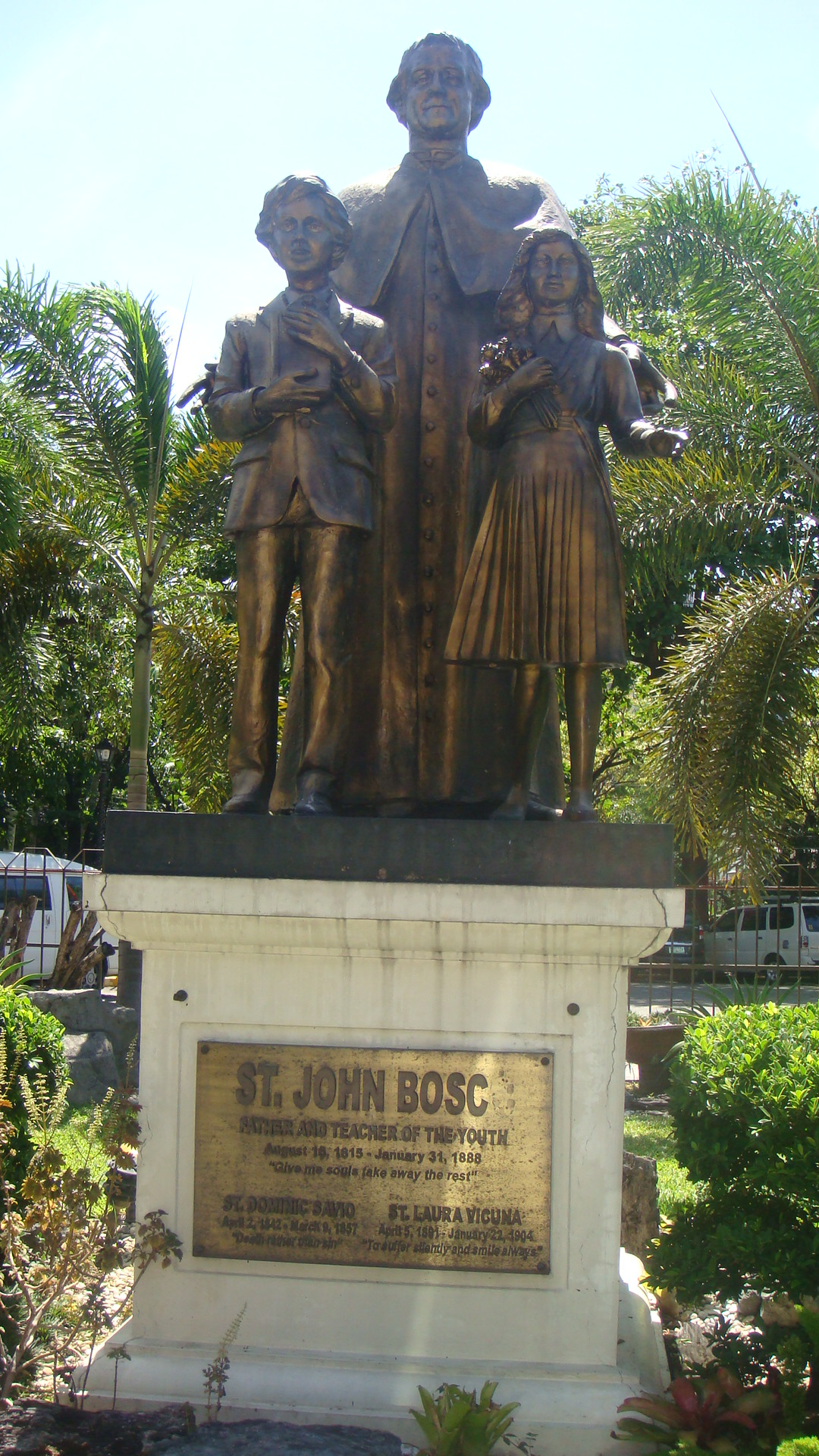
Statue in Makati, Philippines

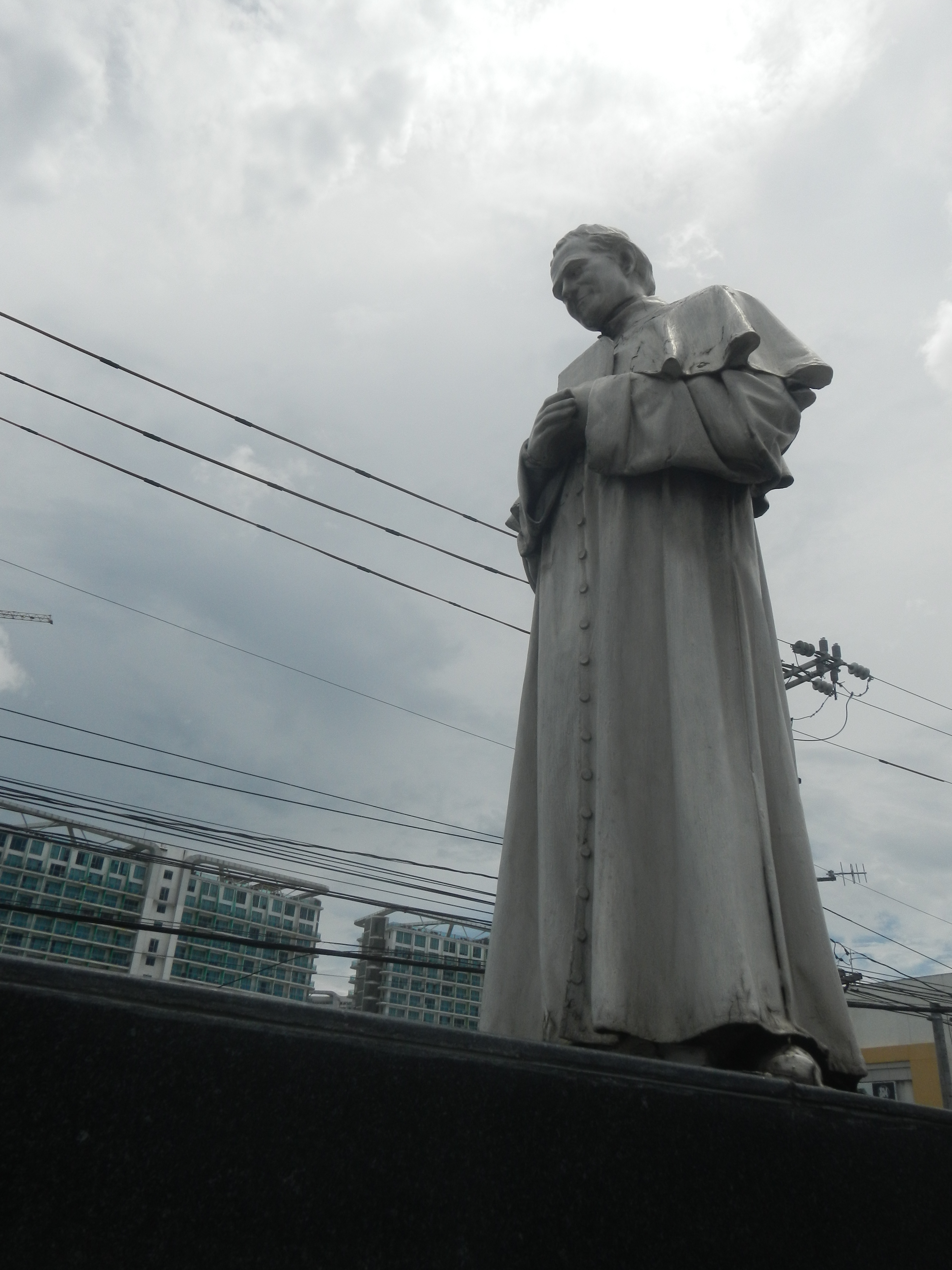
Statue in Parañaque, Philippines

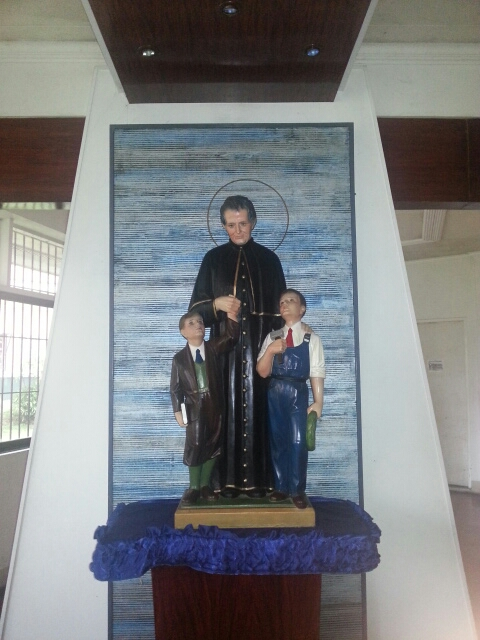
Statue at the Diocesan Shrine of Mary Help of Christians, Canlubang, Calamba, Laguna, Philippines

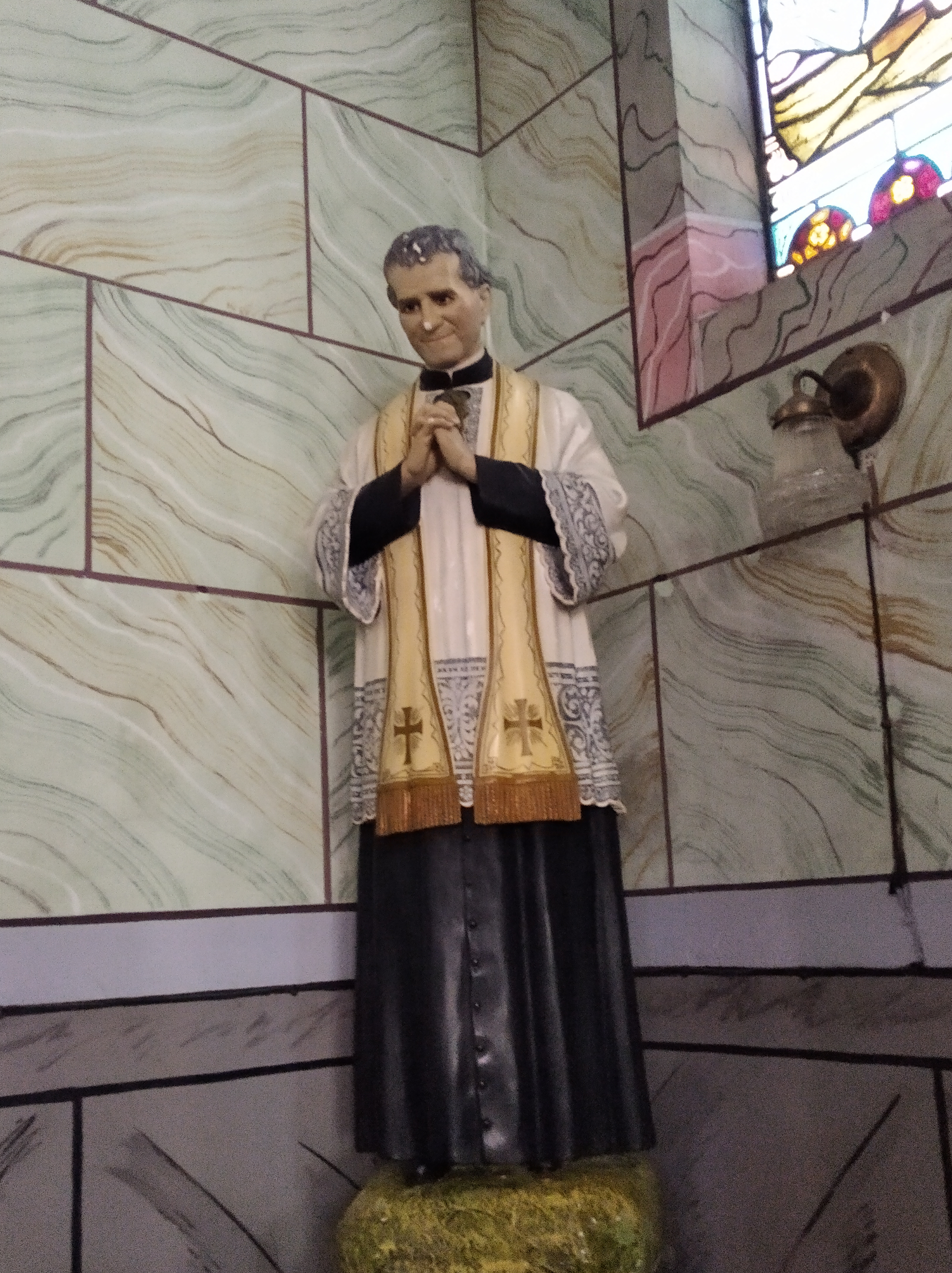
Statue at Catedral São João Batista (Rio do Sul), Brazil

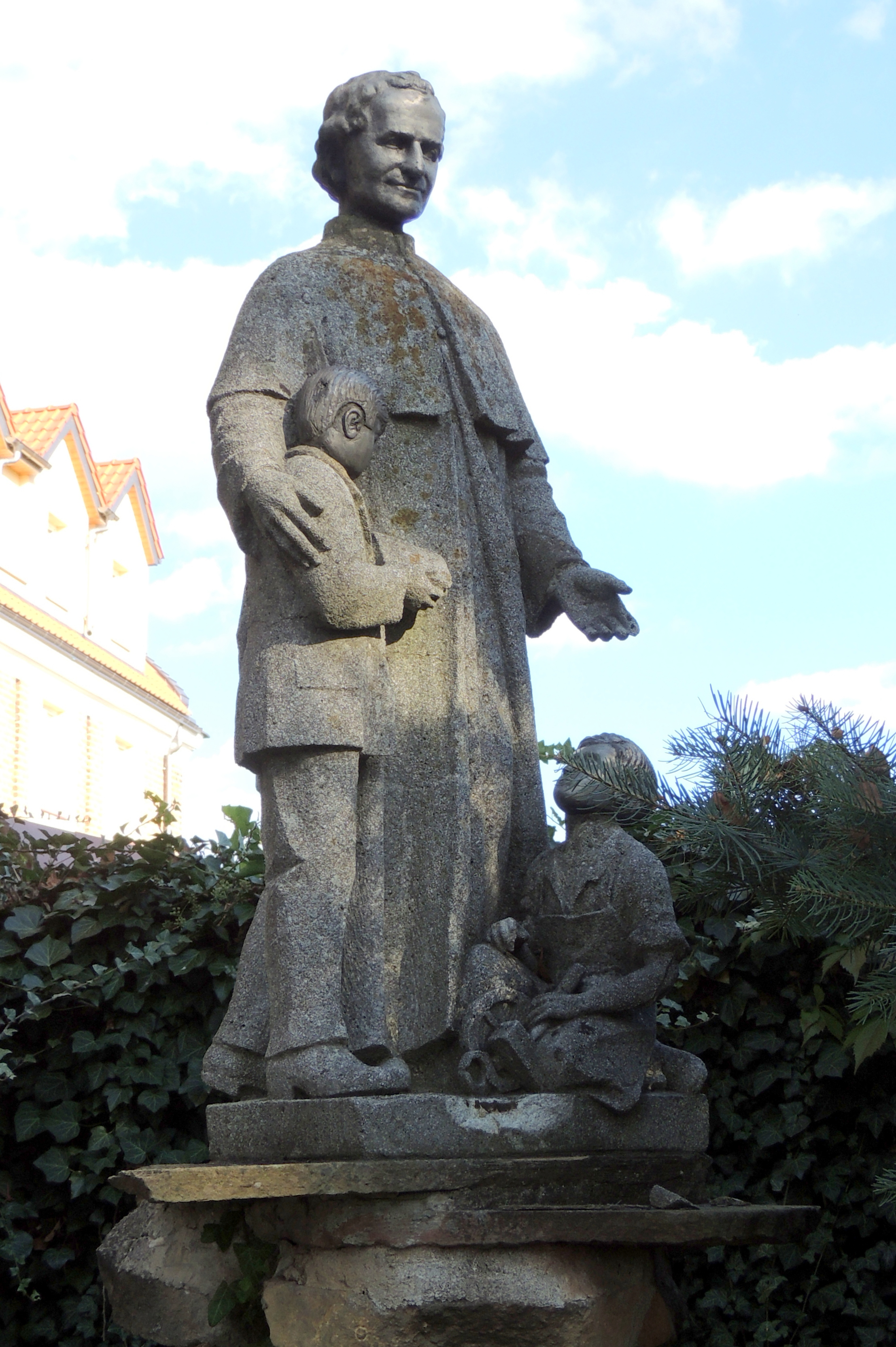
Statue in Lutomiersk Monastery, Poland

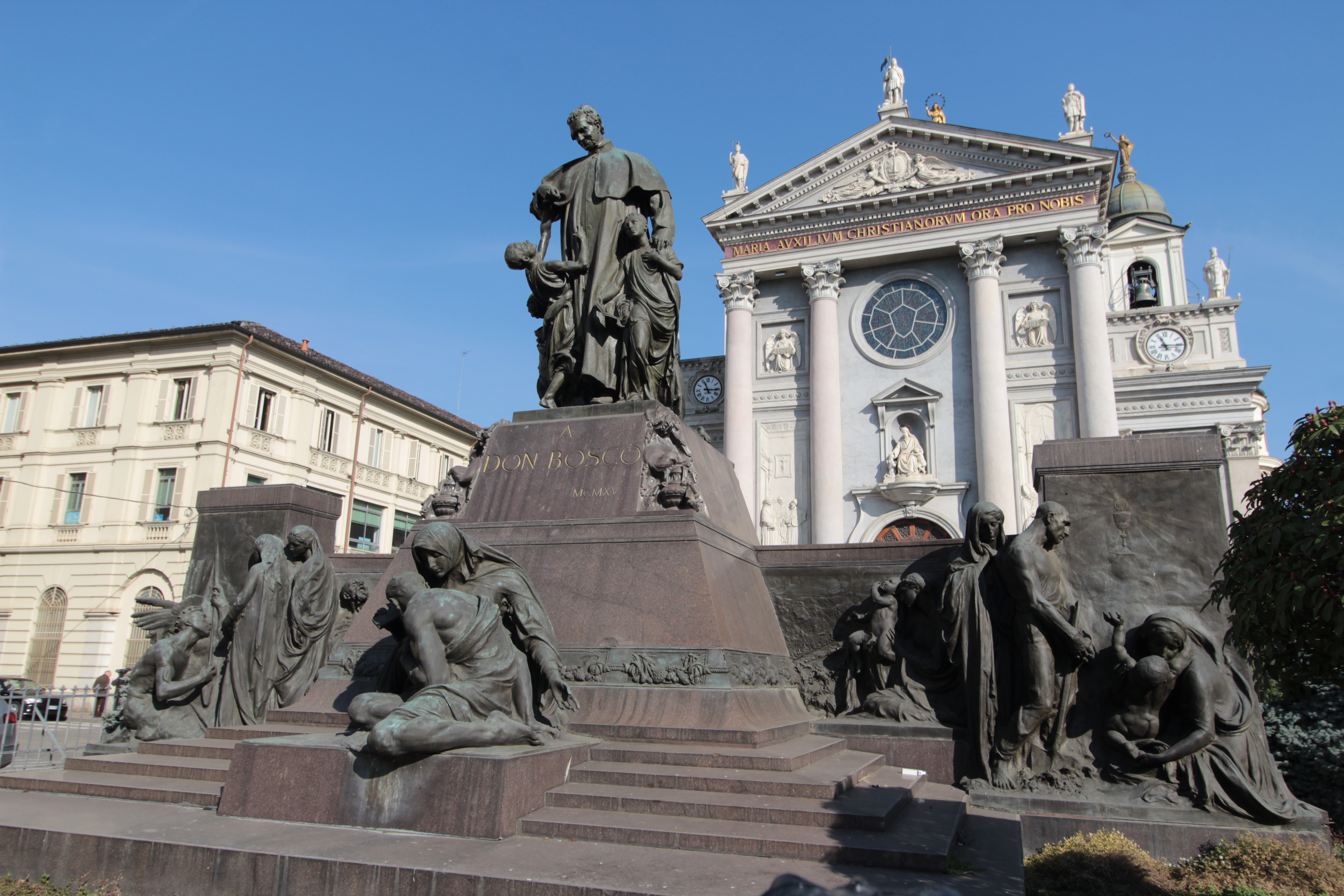
Monument to Don John Bosco, Turin, Italy

== Bibliography ==
General

- Butler, Alan (1999). Butler's lives of the saints. Tunbridge Wells: Burns & Oates. ISBN 0860122522.
- Farmer, David Hugh (2004). The Oxford Dictionary of Saints (5 ed.). Oxford: Oxford Univ. Press. ISBN 0198609493.
- Coulter, Michael L.; Myers, Richard S.; Varacalli, Joseph A. (2012). "Bosco, St. John (1815–1888)". Encyclopedia of Catholic Social Thought, Social Science, and Social Policy Supplement. Vol. 3. Scarecrow Press. pp. 36–38. ISBN 978-0810882669.

Publications of the Holy See

- Pope Pius IX (2 June 1929), Appostolic letter Mirabilis Deus on the occasion of the Beatification of Father John Bosco (in Italian), Vatican: Holy See
- Pope Pius IX (1 April 1934), Lettera Decretale di Sua Santità Pio Xi "Geminata Laetitia" che Proclama Santo Don Giovanni Bosco [Decretal Letter Geminata Laetitia for the canonization of Father John Bosco] (in Italian), Vatican: Holy See

Publications of the Salesians of Don Bosco

- Lemoyne, Giovanni Battista; Amadei, Angelo; Ceria, Eugenio (1965–1988). Borgatello, Diego (ed.). Biographical Memoirs of St. John Bosco. New Rochelle, New York: Don Bosco Publications.
  - Memorie Biografiche di San Giovanni Bosco (in Italian). Archived from the original on 18 June 2013. "19 volumes: Vols. 1–9 by Lemoyne); 10 (1939, by Amadei); 11–19 (1930–1939, by Ceria"
- Morrison, John (1999). The Educational Philosophy of Don Bosco (Indian ed.). Guwahati, India: Don Bosco Publications. ISBN 81-87637-00-5.

Catholic Church titles
New institution	Rector Major of the Salesians; 18 December 1859 - 31 January 1888	Succeeded by Michael Rua
