= Giovanni Melchiorre Calosso =

Italian priest (1759–1830)

Giovanni Melchiorre Calosso (1759 – 21 November 1830) was an Italian priest. He is significant due to his mention in John Bosco's memoirs for having assisted Bosco greatly in becoming a priest himself.

== Biography ==
Little to nothing is known concerning Calosso's youth. In 1772, he graduated from the University of Turin with a degree in theology. In 1813, he became a guest of his brother and the priest of the town Berzano di San Pietro. LaIn 1829, aged 70, he relocated and became Murialdo's chaplain. It was there that he met young Bosco. He was impressed by the youth's ability to memorize and recite that day's sermon, so much so that he decided to instruct Bosco personally, so that Bosco could become a priest as he wished.

One year later, on 21 November 1830, Calosso was struck by apoplexy, while Bosco was out on an errand. On his death bed, he asked to see Bosco one last time. Bosco ran to Calosso's house, where, just before he died, unable to speak because of the pain, Calosso gave Bosco the key to a drawer, telling him that what it contained was for him, and him alone. At the funeral, Bosco gave the key to Calosso's grandnephews. Contained within the safe was six thousand lira, which Bosco refused to accept, overcome with the loss of his father-figure.
