= Margherita Occhiena =

Mother of John Bosco

Venerable Margherita Occhiena Bosco
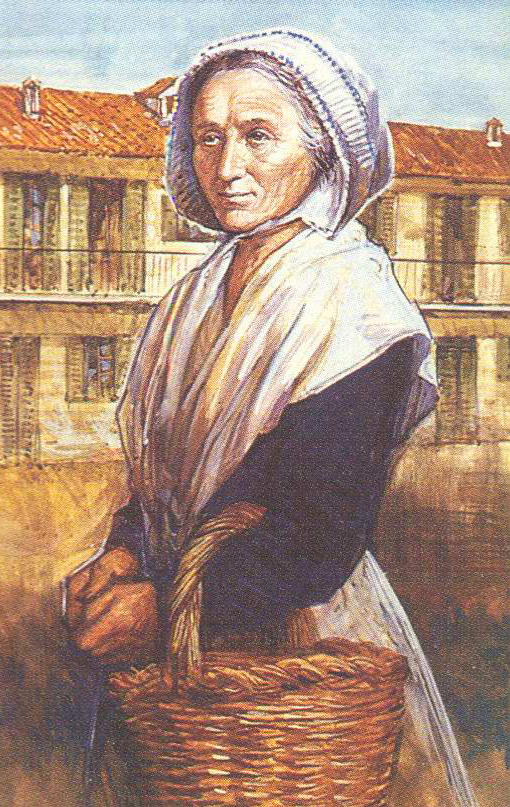
- Born: 1 April 1788; Valdocco, Turin, Italy
- Died: 25 November 1856 (aged 68); Capriglio, Asti, Italy
- Influenced: John Bosco

Margherita Occhiena Bosco (1 April 1788 – 25 November 1856) was the mother of John Bosco and worked with the poor and the less fortunate. Pope Benedict XVI proclaimed her to be venerable in 2006.

== Biography ==
Margherita Occhiena was born on 1 April 1788 in Capriglio in Asti, the sixth of ten children. At the age of 24 she married 27 year old Francesco Bosco, a family friend and widower whose wife and infant daughter had died shortly after childbirth, leaving him with a three-year-old son, Anthony. The family settled in Becchi, a hamlet of Castelnuovo d'Asti (today Castelnuovo Don Bosco). Francesco died of pneumonia in May 1817, leaving the 29-year-old Margherita a single mother with three sons: Antonio, Giuseppe and Giovanni (John).

Okiena, a strong woman with a clear-minded approach, raised her sons with habits of disciplined living—a regimen that, while rigorous, was always reasonable. Although the boys were quite different from one another in temperament, Okiena ensured that they all received a foundational grounding in Christian teachings. When faced with life’s difficult challenges, she modeled for them the virtues of faith, wisdom, and courage.

While Antonio served as the bread winner for the family, he also made life difficult for his more studious young brother, John. To keep peace in the family, Occhiena convinced Antonio to let John leave home to continue his schooling. With the support of his mother, John was able to complete his studies and be ordained a priest.

In 1846, John became ill and Occhiena moved to Turin to care for him. After he recovered, she stayed to assisted him in his work with the poor and abandoned boys who were flocking to the city. For the next ten years she served as a surrogate mother for the hundreds of boys who called her "Mamma Margherita". The school and boys' club called the Oratory continued to expand.

Though she herself was illiterate, Occhiena's wisdom and goodness became the model for the "preventive system" that was the basis of Don Bosco's educational approach. Throughout her life, Occhiena put God first and above all, consumed in a life of poverty, prayer and sacrifice. She died of pneumonia, at the age of 68 in Turin on 25 November 1856.

== Beatification process ==
The beatification process for Margherita Occhiena commenced on 7 March 1995 with the declaration of the nihil obstat ("nothing against") by the Congregation for the Causes of Saints under Pope John Paul II, thereby declaring her to be a Servant of God. On 23 October 2006, Pope Benedict XVI proclaimed her to be venerable, having lived a life of heroic virtue.
