= Don Bosco Technical Institute – Tarlac =

Roman Catholic school in Tarlac, Philippines

Don Bosco Technical Institute Tarlac
- Institusyong Teknikal ng Don Bosco (Filipino)

Location
- Sto. Cristo Tarlac City, Tarlac; Philippines; 15°29′12″N 120°35′37″E

Information
- Former name: St. John Bosco Academy (1947–1978)
- Type: Private, Catholic, Salesian, Non-profit All-male basic education institution
- Motto: Ducere Est Servire (To Lead is to Serve)
- Religious affiliations: Roman Catholic (Salesians)
- Established: 1947; 79 years ago
- Founder: Fr. James Wilson
- Rector: Fr. Eugenio Raymundo "Joji" B. Inocentes III, SDB
- Enrollment: Approx. 2,000
- Campus: Urban
- Colors: Gray, blue, white
- Song: Hail Don Bosco!
- Athletics: MILO Best Pasarelle, SBP, TCPEIA, CEAP,
- Mascot: Greywolf named Grigio
- Nickname: Bosconian
- Affiliations: PAASCU, TCPEIA
- Patron saint: St. John Bosco
- Website: www.dbtarlac.edu.ph

Don Bosco Technical Institute in Tarlac City (formerly, Don Bosco Academy), or simply Don Bosco Tarlac, is a private Catholic school for pre-school, grade school and junior high school boys. In 2016, it opened its co-educational senior high school department. The first Don Bosco school in the Philippines, it is the only academic-technical school in Tarlac. Its campus is located in Sto. Cristo, Tarlac City, Philippines.

This school has been named after St. John Bosco whom the Church has proclaimed Father and Teacher of the Youth. He dedicated his life to teaching. To continue this work, he founded a religious society of priests and brothers – the Salesians of Don Bosco (SDB).

The Don Bosco Technical Institute is made up of the Educative Pastoral Community. Its main components are the Salesians, the teaching and non-teaching personnel, the alumni, the parents, and the students.

== History ==
Don Bosco Tarlac was opened in 1947 in the rented Oriente Hotel by Fr. James Wilson, an American army chaplain at Clark Air Base concerned with the Catholic education of the youth of Tarlac. Because of his devotion to the saint, he named his school St. John Bosco Academy. It transferred to its present site in Brgy. Sto. Cristo in 1948. In 1951, the school received its first Salesian, Fr. Anthony di Falco, SDB. From then onwards, it received a steady stream of Salesians who continued to improve the school. It started its technical curriculum in 1974 and four years later came to be known as Don Bosco Technical Institute. From a student population of 80 in 1947, it has grown to around more than 2,000 students at present.

The first Salesian educational institution, St. John Bosco Academy, was founded in 1947 in Tarlac. A second institution was established in 1952 at Victorias, Negros Occidental, and was followed by other schools in Mandaluyong in 1953, in Cebu and in Makati in 1954 and eventually in Bacolor, Pampanga in 1956.

== The seal of the school ==
The seal of Don Bosco Technical Institute Tarlac consists of the gear, flask, laurels, and the anchor. The gear is the symbol of technical education. The flask symbolizes academic education provided by the school with special emphasis on science. The laurels point to the contribution of the institution in preparing capable citizens. The anchor is the symbol of Christ.

On its golden jubilee, the school added the motto in Latin under the seal: Ducere est servire (To lead is to serve).

== Patron saints ==
=== St. John Bosco ===
Giovanni Melchior Bosco (August 16, 1815 – January 31, 1888), commonly called Don Bosco was an Italian Catholic priest, educator and recognized pedagogue, who put in practice the dogma of his religion, employing teaching methods based on love rather than punishment. He placed his works under the protection of Francis de Sales; thus his followers styled themselves the Salesian Society.

Bosco established a network of centers to carry on his work. In recognition of his work with disadvantaged youths, he was canonized in 1934.

=== St. Dominic Savio ===
Saint Dominic Savio (April 2, 1842 – March 9, 1857) was an Italian adolescent who died at the age of fourteen. Today, he is honored as the patron saint of juvenile delinquents. He is the youngest non-martyr to be named a saint. He was canonized by Pope Pius XII in 1954.

=== Section patrons ===
- Giovanni Cagliero
- James Costamagna
- Leonardo Murialdo
- Elia Comini
- Ninni di Leo
- Luigi Variara
- Luigi Comollo
- Pedro Calungsod
- Józef Kowalski
- Francis Besucco
- Ceferino Namuncurá
- Domenichino Zamberletti
- Octavio Ortiz Arrieta
- Joseph Cafasso
- Lorenzo Ruiz de Manila
- Vincent Cimatti
- Attilio Giordani
- Alberto Marvelli
- Callistus Caravario
- Luigi Guanella
- Luigi Orione
- Istvan Sándor
- Luigi Versiglia
- Andrew Beltrami
- Jóse Calasanz
- August Czartoryski
- Joseph Quadrio
- Artemide Zatti
- José Aparicio Sanz
- Pascual Chavez Villanueva
- Luis Ricceri
- Philip Rinaldi
- Renato Ziggiotti
- Ángel Fernández Artime
- Paul Albera
- Pietro Ricaldone
- Michele Rua
- Egidio Viganò
- Emilio Baggio
- Carlo Braga
- Maurillo Candusso
- José Luis Carreño
- Alfred Cogliandro
- John de Reggi
- Luigi Ferrari
- Rafael Mrzel
- Mario Rossi
- John Rutkowski
- Laura Vicuña
- Attilo Guerrino Boscariol
- Andrew Bragion
- Felix Glowicki
- Luis Iriarte
- John Monchiero
- Thomas Orsolin
- Pierangelo Quaranta
- Dante Sacchi
- George Schwarz
- Miguel Solaroli

== The Salesians of Don Bosco ==
The Salesian community for school year 2026–2027 consists of:

- Rev. Fr. Eugenio Raymundo "Joji" B. Inocentes III, SDB – Rector
- Rev. Fr. Jose Felimar B. Valenzuela, SDB – Economer & DBYC Director
- Rev. Fr. Jose Isidro S. Torres, SDB – HS Spiritual Moderator
- Rev. Fr. Daniel R. Gonzales, SDB – Elementary Spiritual Moderator, Elementary-JHS Principal & DBEC Chancellor
- Rev. Fr. Reynold Ranjo, SDB – Confessor
- Cl. Ruel Gonzales, SDB – Brother Assistant

== See also ==
- Don Bosco Technical College, Mandaluyong
- Don Bosco Technical Institute, Makati
- Don Bosco Academy, Pampanga
- Don Bosco Technical Institute, Victorias
- Don Bosco School, Manila
