= Salesians of Don Bosco in the Philippines =

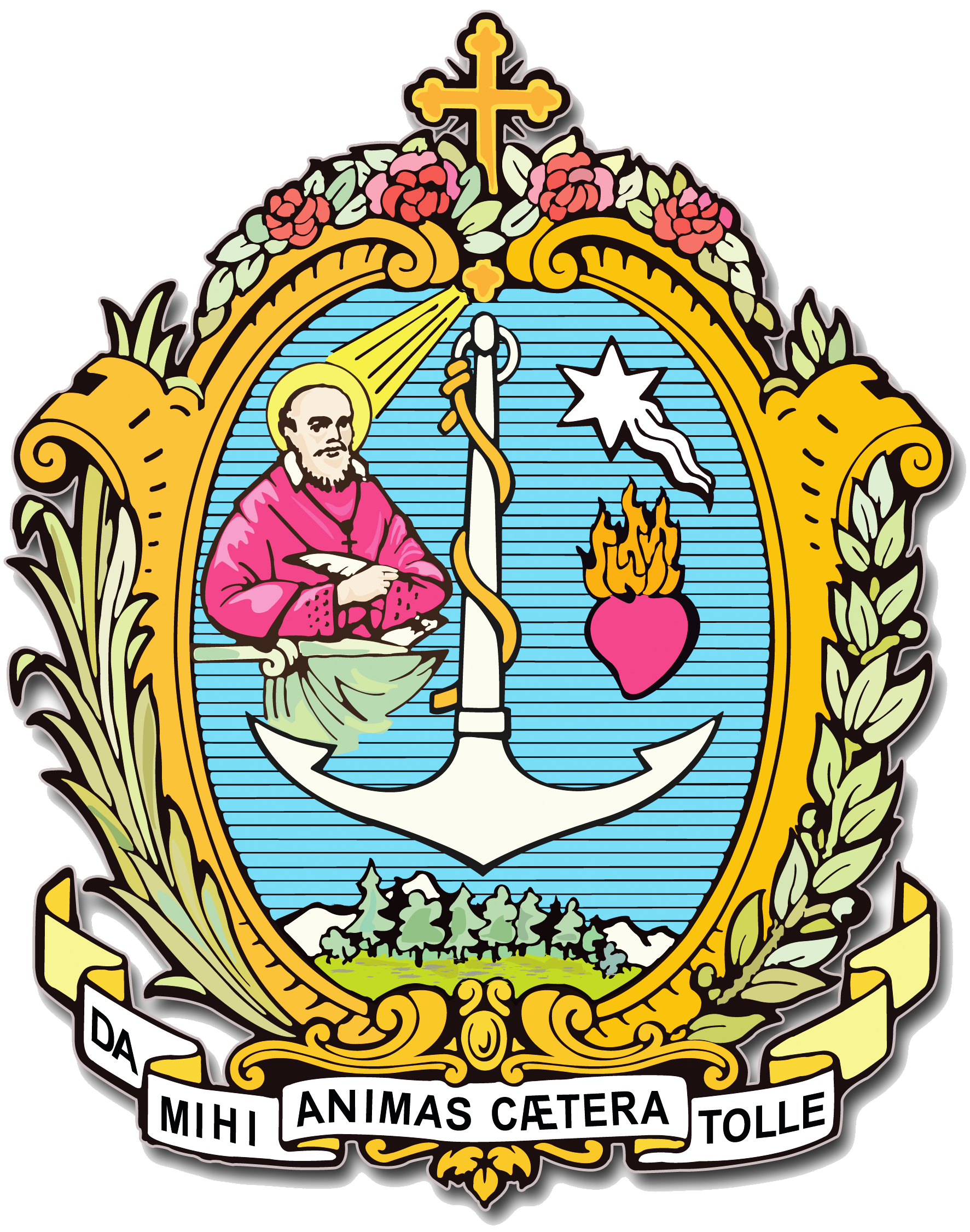
- Coat of Arms of the Salesians; Logo of the Salesians

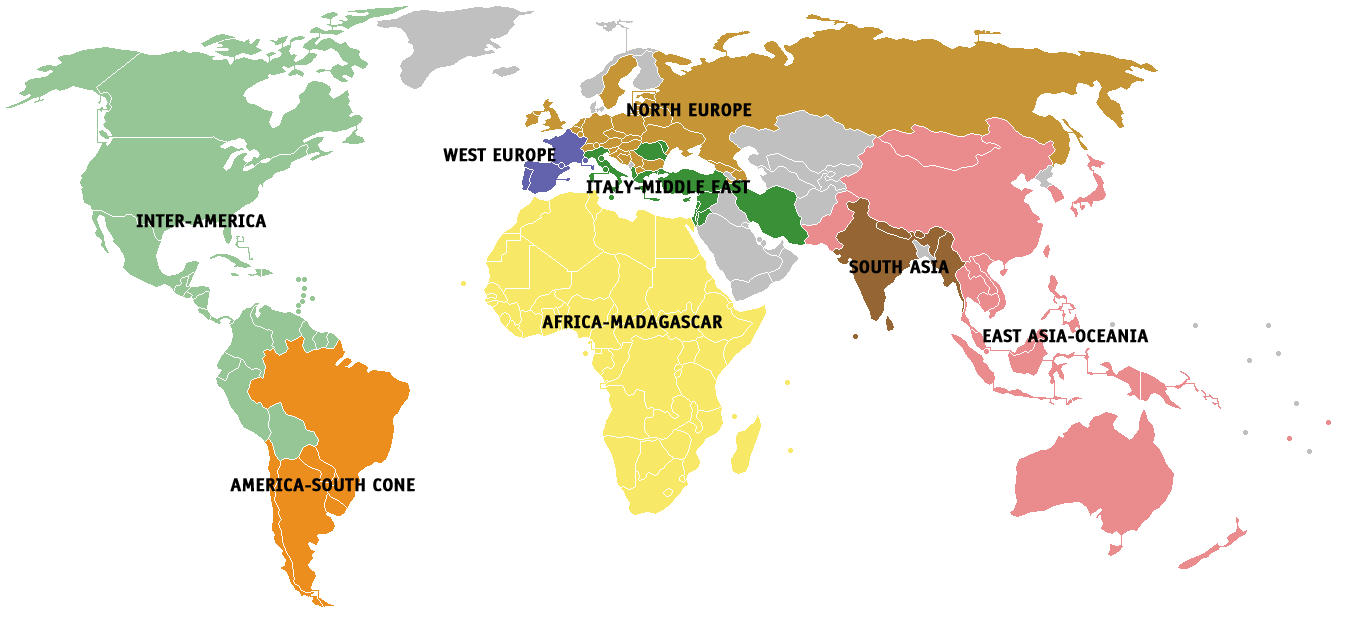
- Map showing the regions marked with the locations of provincial and vice provincial headquarters.
- Abbreviation: S.D.B.
- Formation: 18 December 1859
- Founder: St. John Bosco
- Type: Clerical Religious Congregation (Clerical religious institute of pontifical right)
- Purpose: Dedicated to do apostolic works
- Headquarters: Direzione Generale Opere Don Bosco, Via della Pisana 1111, Casella Postale 18333, 00163 Roma
- Rector Major: Fr. Fabio Attard, SDB
- Vicar of the Rector Major: Fr. Francesco Cereda
- Main organ: Rector Major And General Council
- Website: sdb.org/en
- Formerly called: Society of St Francis of Sales

The Salesians of Don Bosco in the Philippines is a Catholic religious congregation of pontifical right working in the Philippines under two jurisdictions: for Luzon, the Philippine North Province (FIN); for Visayas and Mindanao, the Philippine South Province (FIS). The Salesians started working in the Philippines in 1951. The FIN has 25 canonically erected communities while the FIS has 14 canonically erected communities.

== Salesian Works and Presences ==
The Salesian presences refer to a physical presence of a Salesian work in a geographical area. Salesian presences may house more than one Salesian community doing one or more works. A Salesian community on the other hand is a religious house that has been canonically established by the congregation to live in a stable manner in a Salesian presence. Salesians identify eight official works:

1. Oratory and Youth Center
2. School and Professional Formation
3. Boarding and Hostel
4. Tertiary Sector
5. Parish
6. Social Services and Works for Youth at Risk
7. Social Communication
8. New Forms of Salesian Presence

== Philippine North Province ==
=== Schools ===
- Don Bosco College - Canlubang, Calamba, Laguna
- Caritas Don Bosco School - Laguna Technopark, Biñan
- Don Bosco Technical College - Mandaluyong
- Don Bosco Technical Institute - Makati
- Don Bosco Technical Institute - Tarlac City, Tarlac
- Don Bosco Academy - Mabalacat, Pampanga
- Don Bosco Academy - Bacolor, Pampanga

=== Parishes and Shrines ===
- Minor Basilica and National Shrine of Mary Help of Christians Parish - Parañaque
- Mary Help of Christians Parish - Mayapa, Calamba, Laguna
- Diocesan Shrine of Mary Help of Christians - Canlubang, Calamba, Laguna
- San Ildefonso Parish - Makati
- St. John Bosco Parish - Makati
- St. John Bosco Parish and Youth Center - Tondo, Manila
- St. John Bosco Parish and Center for Young Workers - Santa Rosa, Laguna
- St. Dominic Savio Parish - Mandaluyong

=== Youth at Risk ===
- Tuloy (formerly Tuloy sa Don Bosco) - Alabang, Muntinlupa
- Pugad (Center for Migrant Youth) - Makati

=== Formation Houses ===
- Don Bosco Pre-novitiate Formation House (Aspirantate and Prenovitiate) - Canlubang, Calamba, Laguna
- Don Bosco School of Theology (formerly known as Don Bosco Center of Studies) - Parañaque
- Don Bosco Center for Spirituality (Retreat House / Chapel on the Hill) - Batulao, Nasugbu, Batangas
- Sacred Heart Post Novitiate (School of Philosophy) - Canlubang, Calamba, Laguna

== Philippine South Province ==
=== Schools ===
- Don Bosco Technical Institute (DBTI) - Victorias City
- Don Bosco Technical College-Cebu (DBTC) (formerly Don Bosco Technology Center) - Cebu City
- Don Bosco High School (in partnership with Local Government) - Cotcot, Liloan, Cebu
- Don Bosco Training Center and Youth Center - Borongan, Easter Samar
- Don Bosco Technological Center, Inc. - Prenza, Balamban, Cebu
- Don Bosco Youth Center and Training Center - Pasil, Cebu City
- St. Louis School - Don Bosco (SLS-DB) - Dumaguete City

=== Parishes and Shrines ===
- Archdiocesan Shrine of Our Lady of Lourdes - Punta Princesa, Cebu City
- Sto. Nino Parish - Pasil, Cebu City
- St. John Bosco Parish - Cotcot, Liloan, Cebu
- Diocesan Shrine of St. John Bosco - Murcia, Negros Occidental
- St. Joseph the Worker Parish - Victorias City, Negros Occidental
- Mary Help of Christians Parish - Dacudao, Calinan, Davao City
- Sacred Heart of Jesus Parish - Mati City, Davao Oriental

=== Youth at Risk ===
- Don Bosco Boys Home - Liloan, Cebu
- Magone Home After Care Services - Liloan, Cebu
- Bacolod Boys Home (chaplaincy) - Bacolod City
- Don Bosco Boys Home - Dumangas, Iloilo

=== Formation Houses ===
- Sacred Heart Novitiate - Lawaan, Talisay City, Cebu
- Don Bosco Formation Center - Lawaan, Talisay City, Cebu
- Don Bosco Center of Spirituality - Retreat House - Lawaan, Talisay City, Cebu
- Don Bosco Center of Spirituality - Retreat House - Granada, Bacolod City
- Don Bosco Center of Spirituality - Retreat House - Mambucal, Murcia, Negros Occidental
- Don Bosco House of Spirituality - Mantalongon, Dalaguete, Cebu
- Center for Lay Adults and Youth (CLAY) - Lawaan, Talisay City, Cebu

== See also ==
Salesians of Don Bosco
Portal - Salesians of Don Bosco Philippines
Salesians of Don Bosco - Philippine North (FIN)
Salesians of Don Bosco - Philippine South (FIS)
