= Don Bosco Academy, Pampanga =

Roman Catholic school in Pampanga, Philippines

Don Bosco Academy of Pampanga, Inc.

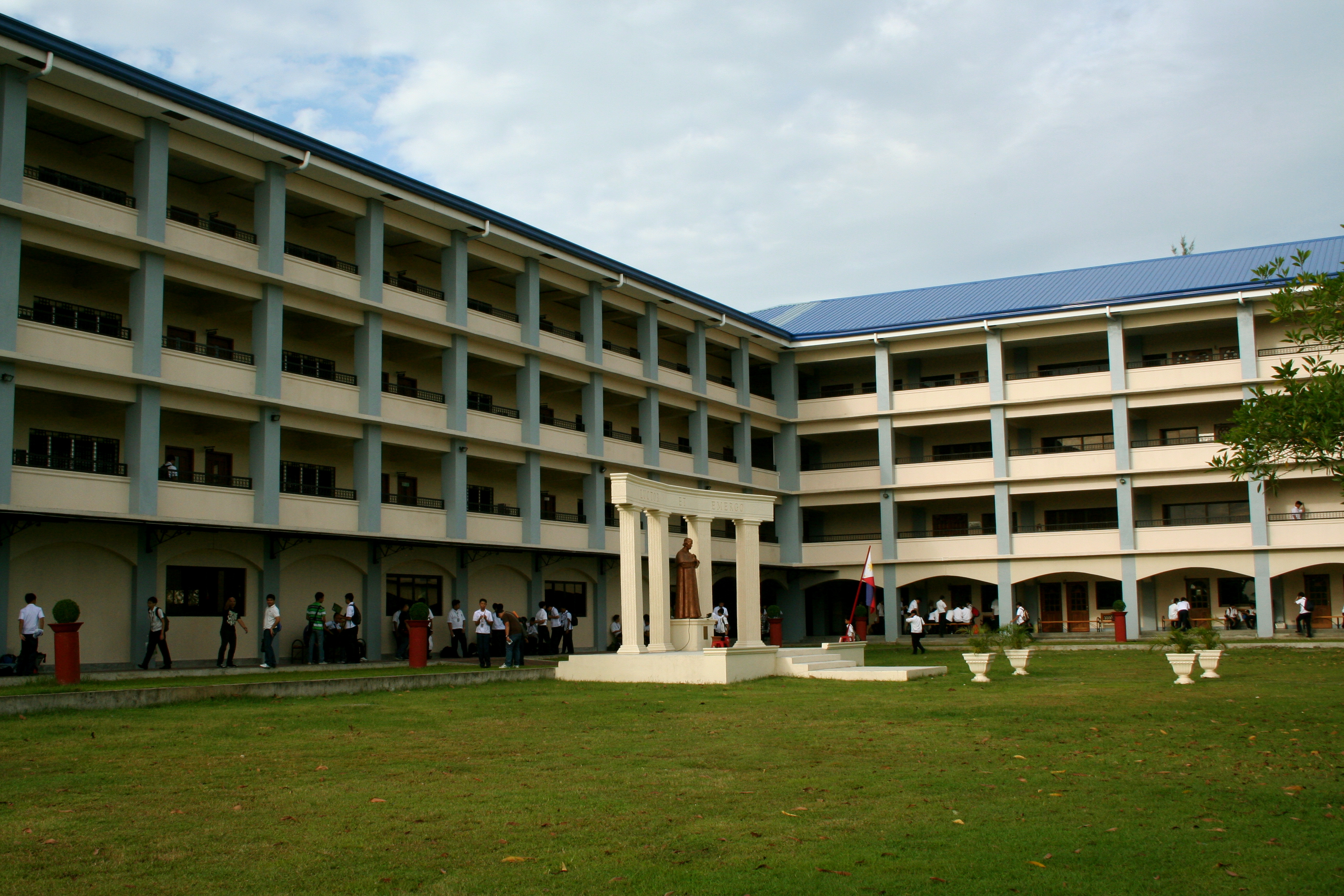
- School field
- Purple Lea St., Don Bosco Compound, Mabiga, Mabalacat City, Pampanga; Philippines

Information
- Type: Private technical non-profit all-boys Basic education institution
- Motto: Luctor Et Emergo (Latin) (I Struggle, I Win)
- Established: 1956; 70 years ago
- Rector: Fr. Ulysses S. Rimbawa, SDB
- School Director: Fr. Abel R. De Ocampo, Jr., SDB
- Enrollment: Approx. 1,100
- Campus: Don Bosco Academy Mabalacat
- Colors: Gray, blue, white
- Sports: PAASCU
- Mascot: Grigio the Gray Wolf
- Nickname: Grey Wolves
- Affiliation: Roman Catholic (Salesian)
- Website: https://dbamabalacat.one-bosco.org/

Don Bosco Academy also referred to by its acronym DBA or Don Bosco Pampanga" is a private Catholic Salesian technical educational institution for boys run by the Salesians of the Society of Saint John Bosco in Bacolor, Pampanga, Philippines. It was founded in 1956 by the (Salesians).

The school was named after St. John Bosco whom the Catholic Church has proclaimed as the "Father and Teacher of Youth." St. John Bosco dedicated his life to the education of the youth. To continue this work, he founded a religious congregation of priests and brothers - the Salesians of Don Bosco (SDB).

== History ==
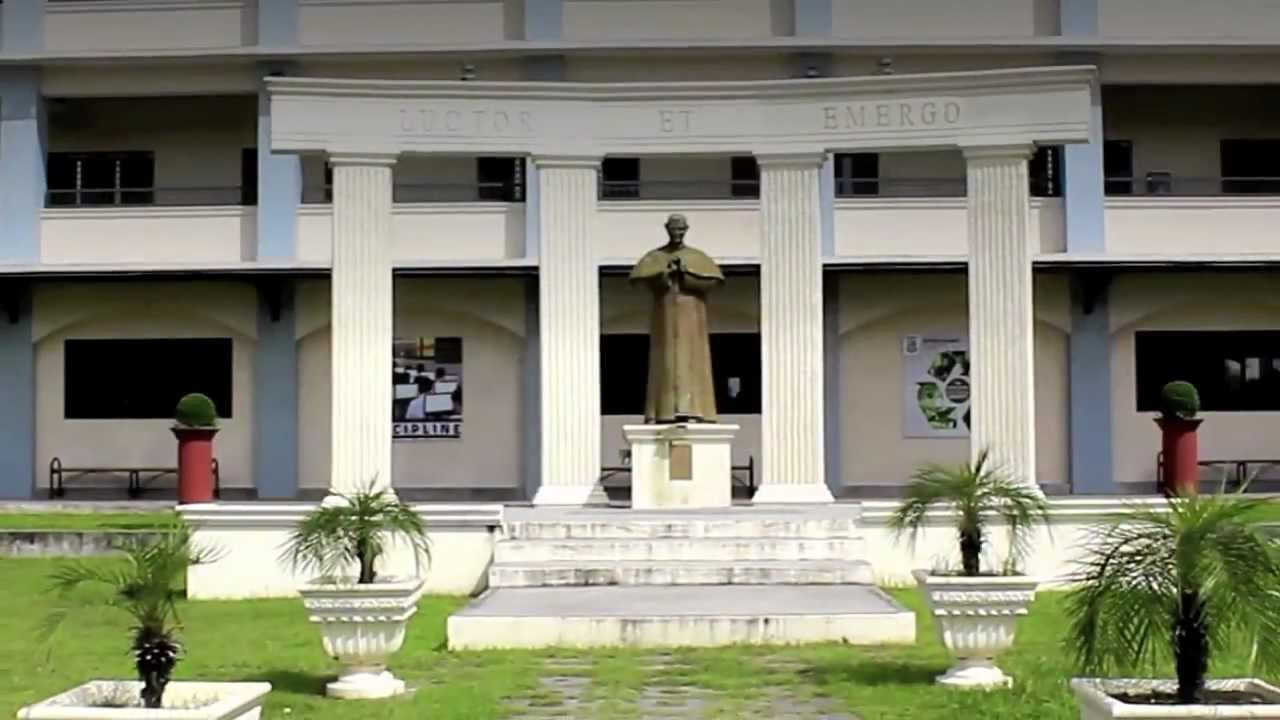
Statue of Don Bosco

When Don Bosco Academy was established in 1956 by the Salesians, its campus was located in the municipality of Bacolor, Pampanga. After hardships and overall lack of funds, the school stopped operations temporarily after a year. Rev. Fr. Godfrey Roozen, SDB, founder of Don Bosco Academy at Bacolor sought out new areas until he met Don Pedro de Leon who offered a five-hectare land.

The years that followed saw a continuous increase in the enrollment of students that necessitated the construction of more buildings and facilities inside the DBA campus. The grade school curriculum offering expanded to add Grades 3 to 4.

In 1963, a fourth edifice was added. This was the two-story Juniorate or Salesian School for Minor Seminarians. A large multi-purpose gymnasium was also built on the same year to house the sports and cultural facilities of the school.

As DBA's fame grew, the school experienced a significant increase in student population to a point that the school had to regulate admissions in the form of entrance exams and interviews. The years that followed saw a continuous increase in enrollment of students that necessitated the construction of more buildings and facilities inside the DBA campus.

When Mt. Pinatubo in the province of Pampanga erupted in 1991, lahar covered most of the buildings of Don Bosco Academy. The school almost transferred to another province if not for the intervention of Archbishop Paciano Aniceto, D.D. of the Archdiocese of San Fernando. Through the generous offering of the Benedictine Sisters of Saint Scholastica’s Academy in Brgy. Quebiawan, City of San Fernando, they allowed Don Bosco Academy to hold classes in their school shifting with their students (Monday to Wednesday for the Scholasticans and Thursday to Saturday for the Bosconians). This continued until Don Bosco Academy transferred its campus to the northern town of Mabalacat City, Pampanga. A four-hectare land in Barangay Mabiga, Mabalacat was donated by the heirs of the late Mr. & Mrs. Tomas and Maria Dizon for the rebuilding of Don Bosco Academy. With this move, the Salesian charism and system of education continued.

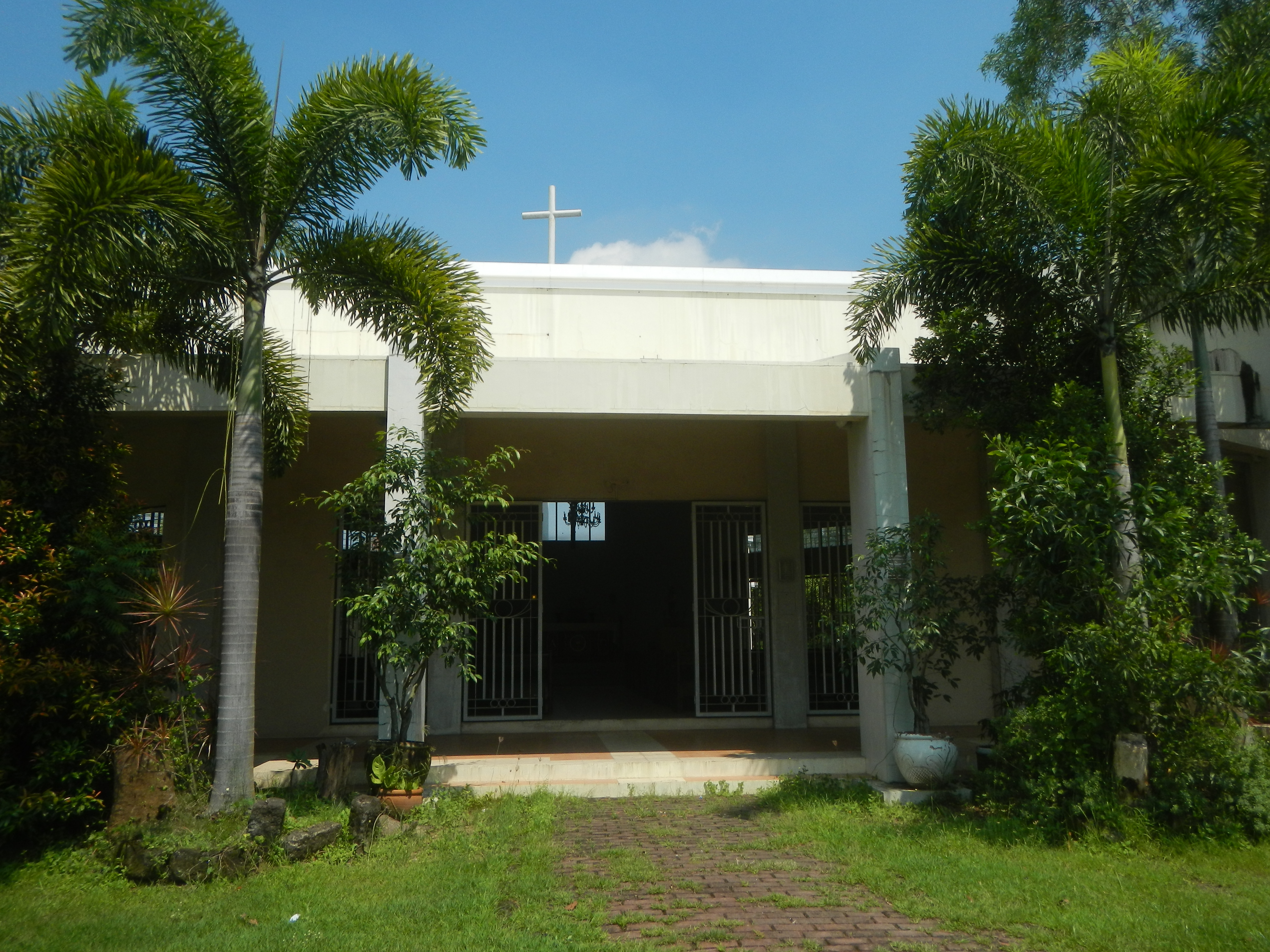
Chapel

In May 2009, the School opened its newest wing, consisting of the St. Francis Auditorium, where some events are held. The Savio Hall holds meetings or some classes if the rooms are not available. Lastly, the General Science and Biology Laboratories and the computer rooms have been moved to the newest wing.

In 2010, Don Bosco Academy inaugurated the gymnasium for badminton together with the expansion of the dining hall of the Salesian Residence in time for the visit of the Regional Superior of the Salesians of Don Bosco, Fr. Vaclav Clement, SDB.

At about August 2011, a new room was built, the Collaborative Classroom, wherein a section will spend 1 day of a regular school day in this classroom, bringing their laptops for various activities. Each day a section is scheduled, starting from the fourth years going down to the Grade Seven.

With the help of the Parents' Council, the Grade School football field was improved in the summer of 2012. Top soil was placed on it and drainage system was installed to avoid the flooding of the field.

In early 2014, two flagpoles were built as part of the A.P. Club's and school year's legacy project.

On March 11, 2015, the renovation on the school chapel started.

A new wing on the High School Building is currently being considered for the expansion for the K-12 program.

2026 - 2027 onward will now allow enrollment of females.

Levels offered in Don Bosco Academy, Pampanga:

Preschool (for boys and girls):

- Kinder

Elementary (for boys and girls):

- Grade 1
- Grade 2
- Grade 3
- Grade 4
- Grade 5
- Grade 6

Junior High School (for boys and girls):

- Grade 7
- Grade 8
- Grade 9
- Grade 10

Senior High School (for boys and girls):

- Science, Technology, Engineering and Mathematics (STEM)
- Accountancy, Business and Management (ABM)
- Humanities and Social Sciences (HUMSS)
- General Academic Strand (GAS)

== Notable alumni ==
- Amando Tetangco, Jr. - is the incumbent Governor of the Bangko Sentral ng Pilipinas (BSP).
- Eddie Panlilio - is a Kapampangan Roman Catholic priest and former governor of the province of Pampanga.
- Dennis Pineda - current governor of Pampanga
- Aljur Abrenica - a Filipino actor. He appeared on the fourth season of StarStruck: The Next Level.
- Vin Abrenica - a Filipino actor who appeared as a contestant on the reality-based talent search show Artista Academy and later won the competition with Sophie Albert. He is a younger brother of GMA Network talent Aljur Abrenica, himself a winner on StarStruck: The Next Level.

== See also ==
- Don Bosco Technical Institute, Tarlac
- Don Bosco Technical College, Mandaluyong
- Don Bosco Technical Institute, Makati
- Don Bosco School, Manila
- Don Bosco Technical Institute, Victorias
