= Tuloy Foundation =

Filipino children's charity

- Tuloy Foundation, Inc.
- Formation: 1993; 33 years ago
- Founder: Marciano Evangelista
- Founded at: Makati
- Type: Nonprofit
- Purpose: Charity for marginalized youth
- Affiliations: Salesians of Don Bosco
- Website: www.tuloyfoundation.online

The Tuloy Foundation, Inc. is a Philippine charitable organization focused on the marginalized youth. It was founded in 1993 by Marciano G. Evangelista of the Salesians of Don Bosco.

== History ==
The Tuloy Foundation was founded in 1993 by Salesian priest Rocky Evangelista in a small room at the St. John Bosco Parish Compound in Makati, Metro Manila with 12 children under its care. Evangelista after a meeting with his religious order, the Salesians of Don Bosco where he committed to head a project for street children, established a center with 10 lay volunteers. He also coordinated with researchers from the University of the Philippines to learn to organize programs and services for children. Envangelista envisioned a Streetchildren Village which would cater to a more larger population.

Two years later, Tuloy received funding to construct a 3.5-storey building within the compound in Makati. The new building had complete facilities including dorms, study area, dining room, and kitchen. It was able to accommodate up to 130 children at a time.

With the help and approval of the Department of Education, Tuloy designed a curriculum especially for street children. In 1997, Tuloy opened a school able to accommodate a maximum of 230 students. In 2001, Tuloy moved to a 4.5-hectare Streetchildren Village in Alabang, Muntinlupa leased from the Department of Social Welfare and Development.

== Social programs ==
Tuloy Foundation organizes various programs catered to street children and other marginalized youth. As a residential care institution, it also provides shelter to children in its dormitories each with its own "head of house" who serves as a parental figure to the dormitories' resident children.

=== Education ===
The Tuloy Foundation offers a non-traditional curriculum for the youth approved by the Department of Education. It uses Alternative Learning System (ALS) modules for its education program.

=== Sports ===
Tuloy is also involved in football and futsal. Many of its youth were part of the Philippines' squad for the Homeless World Cup and Street Child World Cup. Some were part of the Philippine youth national football teams for both boys and girls, and some members of the defunct United Football League, which was the top-flight football league in the country. Tuloy also fielded teams in the Philippines Football League, Tuloy F.C., and the PFF Women's League, Tuloy F.C. (women). The foundation also has its own artificial football pitch, known as the XO Field for Extraordinary Kids, and a futsal center at its Tuloy sa Don Bosco branch.

== Affiliations ==
The Tuloy Foundation is registered as a non-government, not-for-profit organization with the Philippine Securities and Exchange Commission in 1996 and is licensed and accredited by the Department of Social Welfare and Development to “provide residential care services for disadvantaged children and youth”. It also affiliated with the Salesians of Don Bosco.

== Tuloy centers ==
- Tuloy Oasis Nature Therapy Campsite - Nature therapy campsite located in Borlongan, Magdalena, Laguna
- Tuloy sa Don Bosco Streetchildren Village - A 4.5-hectare property in Elsie Gaches Village Compound in Alabang
- Tuloy sa Bahay Bata Angeles City, Pampanga

== Awards ==
- Tuloy Foundation received the 3rd Consuelo Awards of Highest Excellence for outstanding service to the streetchildren of the Philippines.
- Tuloy sa Don Bosco School won fourth place for the Most Outstanding Literacy Program.
- Tuloy received the Consuelo Foundation's Award of Highest Excellence.

== Fr. Rocky Evangelista ==
Fr. Rocky, a Salesian priest, was ordained in 1970 by Pope Paul VI in St. Peter's Square, together with 279 deacons from 65 nations. He does what St. John Bosco tried to do for streetchildren during his time. Fr. Rocky received several prestigious awards including the Presidential Service Award for Service to Children given by the Rotary International; first place honors for Most Outstanding Literacy Worker-national level conducted by the Department of Education. Fr. Rocky, too, became the lead model for the rehabilitation of streetchildren, and named one of the Most Outstanding Citizens of Makati by former Mayor Elenita Binay. He was also conferred the Manuel L. Quezon Award for Exemplary Governance by the Federation of Catholic Schools Alumni/nae Associations. Named as the Captain for the cause of street children by Pres. Gloria-Macapagal Arroyo during her term as vice president and DSWD Secretary, Fr. Rocky has also been awarded as one of the Outstanding Citizens of Makati for the Year 2000.

== See also ==
- Charities in the Philippines
