= Octavio Ortiz Arrieta =

Peruvian Roman Catholic Church prelate

Venerable Octavio Ortiz Arrieta SDB
- Bishop of Chachapoyas
- Church: Roman Catholic Church
- Diocese: Chachapoyas
- See: Chachapoyas
- Appointed: 21 November 1921
- Installed: 1922
- Term ended: 1 March 1958
- Predecessor: Emilio Juan Francisco Lissón y Chávez
- Successor: José Germán Benavides Morriberón

Orders
- Ordination: 27 January 1907
- Consecration: 11 June 1922 by Giuseppe Petrelli
- Rank: Bishop

Personal details
- Born: Octavio Ortiz Arrieta; 19 April 1879 Lima, Peru
- Died: 1 March 1958 (aged 78) Chachapoyas, Amazonas, Peru
- Motto: Da mihi animas ("Give me souls")

Octavio Ortiz Arrieta (19 April 1879 – 1 March 1958) was a Peruvian Salesian who served as Bishop of Chachapoyas from 1921 until his death. Arrieta first studied to become a carpenter at a Salesian-run school but soon decided to become a priest with the order to which he was professed in 1902. He served at several Salesian houses for over the next decade until Pope Benedict XV appointed him as a bishop in late 1921. He was a prolific shepherd of souls; he underwent eight pastoral visitations to all his parishes and travelled far and wide to meet with his people and to launch a range of pastoral initiatives designed to rekindle the faith of the population.

The late bishop's beatification process commenced on 12 November 1990 under Pope John Paul II. Pope Francis titled Arrieta as venerable.

== Life ==
Octavio Ortiz Arrieta was born on 19 April 1879 in Lima as the eighth of nine children to Manuel Arrieta and Benigna Coya.

He studied as a carpenter under the Salesians of Don Bosco since December 1893 but soon decided to become a priest instead; but it was at this stage that his compatriots and superiors realized he possessed those qualities needed for the priesthood while Arrieta decided to become a priest under the Salesians. Father Pane once compiled a list of twelve names for potential Salesian vocations and upon reaching Arrieta's name figured he would make a good bishop sometime in the future. He joined the order for the novitiate on 24 May 1898 at Callao (initial profession followed in 1900) and made his perpetual profession in 1902 into the hands of Paolo Albera which made him the first Peruvian-born Salesian. Arrieta was assigned to found a new vocational school in Piura in 1906 and he was soon ordained to the priesthood at the beginning of 1907.

He was appointed as the director of the Piura houses from 1911–15 and there founded the "La Campanilla" magazine. He went on to serve as the director of the houses at Cuzco (1915–20) and at Callao (1920–21) houses after his ordination where he served for well over a decade. Pope Benedict XV – on 21 November 1921 – appointed him into the episcopate as a bishop and he received his episcopal consecration on 11 June 1922 from Giuseppe Petrelli before he could be installed in his new see. From the November appointment it had taken him a month to reach his see from Lima and arrived sometime in December. He became noted for his closeness to the people and he organized a series of spiritual retreats for them. Arrieta also taught them catechism whenever it was possible for him to do so and also founded a diocesan newspaper for the faithful; he revitalized diocesan initiatives designed to restore the faith in the people and to empower them. He was a supporter of vocational initiatives and promoted them to empower prospective new priests and was a supporter of religious orders due to him being part of one himself. He was cheerful and welcoming and known for his amiable qualities; he undertook eight pastoral visitations and held three diocesan synods as well as reorganizing the archives of parishes. His travels were sometimes dangerous and on two occasions he suffered serious accidents that both ended up with him falling into deep ravines which confined him to hospital for prolonged periods due to broken ribs and bones.

The bishop twice declined appointments to the Lima archdiocese because he wanted to remain close to his own people whom he had come to love and respect. The apostolic nuncio – on the behalf of Pope Pius XII – had made the offer to him but he said that he was "married" to his see. This did not stop the pope who in 1953 titled him as a Monsignor.

His health started to decline into the 1950s and he died on 1 March 1958 after having had an operation around that time. He was interred in the diocesan cathedral.

== Beatification cause ==
The cause for his beatification opened on 12 November 1990 under Pope John Paul II after the Congregation for the Causes of Saints titled Arrieta as a Servant of God once it issued the nihil obstat ("nothing against"). The diocesan phase for beatification occurred from 8 July 1992 until it was closed a decade later on 22 December 2001 at which stage all documentation was sent to the Congregation who validated the process on 3 October 2003.

The positiowas sent to the Congregation for their assessment at which stage it was passed onto the theological advisors who approved the dossier's contents on 19 February 2015.{The cardinal and bishop members of the C.C.S. approved this sometime later on 14 February 2017. Pope Francis titled Arrieta as venerable on 27 February 2017 after confirming that Arrieta has practised heroic virtue. The postulator for this cause is Pierluigi Cameroni SDB.
