= Elia Comini =

Italian priest (1910–1944)

Blessed Elia Comini SDB
- Born: 7 May 1910; Calvenzano di Vergato, Bologna, Kingdom of Italy
- Died: 1 October 1944 (aged 34); Pioppe di Salvaro, Grizzana, Bologna, Kingdom of Italy
- Beatified: September 27, 2026, Basilica of San Petronio, Bologna, Italy by Cardinal Marcello Semeraro
- Feast: 13 October

Elia Comini (7 May 1910 – 1 October 1944) was an Italian religious priest of the Salesians of Don Bosco. He served as a teacher after his ordination to priesthood in two different areas until he returned to his hometown towards the end of the devastating World War II to tend to wounded and displaced people. But the fierce fighting between the Nazis and Allies plus the partisan forces saw Comini and fellow priest Nicola Capelli captured and murdered after the Nazis made accusations of the pair being spies.

Comini's cause for beatification was introduced in 1995. He was decreed a martyr in 2024, and he was beatified on September 27 2026.

== Life ==
Elia Comini was born in Bologna on 7 May 1910 to Claudio Comini (a carpenter) and Emma Limoni (a dressmaker); one brother was Amleto. Comini was baptized in the local parish church on 8 May. In 1914 the Comini's moved to Casetta in the Salvaro parish in Bologna on the banks of the Reno River along the Porrettana road.

He attended the Salesian school in Finale Emilia where he later asked to be admitted into the congregation. He attended the novitiate in Castel de'Britti from 1925 to 1926 before making his first vows on 3 October 1926. Comini's father died sometime during 1926 with the Salvaro archpriest Fidenzio Mellini (who himself knew John Bosco) acted as a sort of surrogate father. Mellini had in fact predicted that Comini would become a priest and held him in high regard due to his goodness and intellect.

Comini completed his studies at the Salesian-run high school in Valsalice in Turin (1926–28) and then graduated in literature from the college in Milan prior to receiving his ordination to the priesthood on 16 March 1935 in the Brescia Cathedral from Bishop Giacinto Tredici. He afterwards served as a teacher at the order's schools in both Chiari in Brescia (1936–41) and Treviglio at the Salesian Aspirantate (1941–44).

In summer 1944 during World War II he returned to Salvaro to aid his frail mother and to render his aid to the aging Monsignor Mellini. But that area was the epicenter of war between the Nazis and the Allies as well as those partisan forces. To that end he turned his attention to the poor and displaced peoples that the war affected. He made himself available for hearing confessions and for preaching while also using his musical abilities to enliven the people.

He soon came into contact with fellow priest Nicola Capelli and the pair often visited refugees and rendered medical aid to those who were wounded. On 29 September 1944 both he and Capelli were arrested en route to Grizzana where 69 people were about to be massacred. He had just celebrated his last Mass that morning. The SS considered them to be spies and so mistreated the pair and used them to transport their ammunition in terrible conditions. On 30 September Comini and Capelli spent their time comforting their fellow prisoners. The attempts made to rescue them were useless for Comini said "either all or none" even after his friend Commissioner Prefect Emilio Veggetti tried to secure his release.

Comini and 44 others were shot dead around dusk on 1 October 1944 in the reservoir of the warehouse of the Industrie Canapiere Italiano. His remains were then cast into the Reno River. Before being shot he and Capelli heard each other's confessions before he granted their fellow hostages absolution in a loud and defiant voice.

== Beatification process ==
Cardinal Giacomo Biffi inaugurated the diocesan investigation in Bologna on 3 December 1995 and closed it later on 25 November 2001. The Congregation for the Causes of Saints validated the process on 1 October 2004. Theologians approved the cause with nine affirmative votes in favor at their meeting held on 4 April 2017. The postulator for this cause is the Pierluigi Cameroni SDB. On 18 December 2024, Pope Francis approved a decree recognizing Comini's martyrdom. On 27 September 2026, Comini, alongside Capelli and Ubaldo Marchioni, was beatified at the San Petronio, Bologna by Cardinal Marcello Semeraro.
