= István Sándor (martyr) =

Hungarian Catholic martyr (1914–1953)

Blessed István Sándor SDB
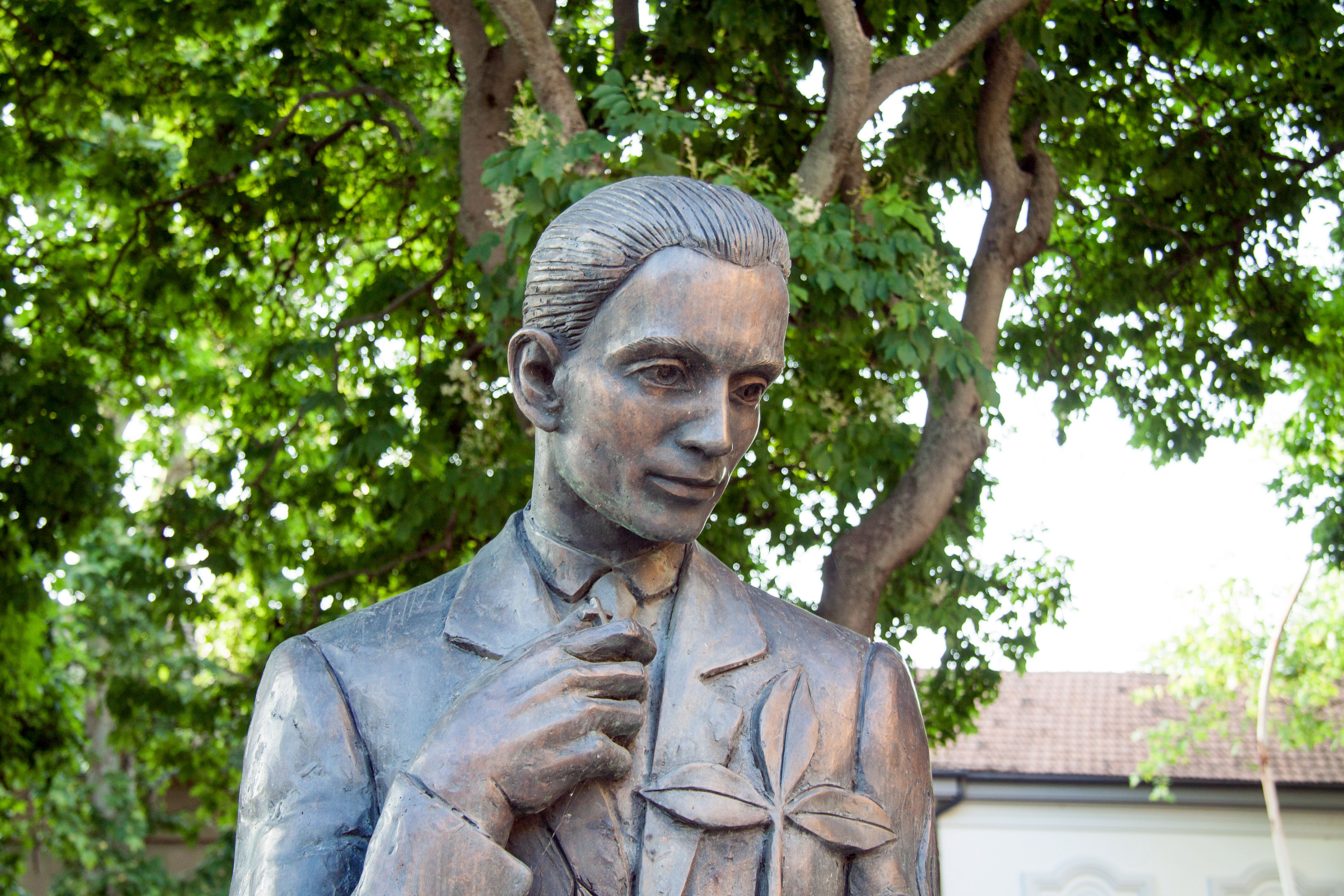
- Statue of István Sándor in Szolnok

Martyr
- Born: 26 October 1914; Szolnok, Hungary
- Died: 8 June 1953 (aged 38); Budapest, Hungary
- Venerated in: Roman Catholic Church
- Beatified: 19 October 2013, Budapest Hungary by Cardinal Angelo Amato SDB
- Feast: 8 June
- Attributes: book, palm

István Sándor (26 October 1914 – 8 June 1953) was a Hungarian Salesian and labourer, martyr and Blessed.

== Life ==
=== Childhood in Szolnok ===
István Sándor was born in Szolnok in 1914, the first year of the First World War. His father, István Sándor, worked for MÁV, the Hungarian State Railways, as an unskilled worker. His mother, Mária Fekete, gave decent education to István and his two younger brothers, László and János, despite the family's poor circumstances.

After four years of primary school, István studied at a state school between 1924 and 1928, and later at a vocational school until 1931. At this school, he studied to become an iron turner and a copper smith. After school, he worked as a stock worker and as a turner for a while.

=== In the Salesian order ===
At the beginning of 1936 he travelled to Budapest in order to be trained to become a printer in the press of the Salesian order in Rákospalota. As an aspirant, he soon took part in the Salesians' education of children, and he dealt with the altar boys primarily. He applied for admission to the novitiate half a year later. First, the province council suggested two years of probationary period for him since he had to complete his aspirant period as well as his printer apprenticeship first, which he accomplished in March 1938. He started the novitiate in Mezőnyárád the same year. However, he was conscripted into the army soon, so he had to restart the novitiate in the summer of 1939, and he made his first temporary vows in 1940.

Two years later he was conscripted again as a Salesian helping brother. He took part in the battles of the Second World War as a correspondent and telegrapher. He served in Délvidék, Erdély, Felvidék and at the Don-bend too. He received an award for his brave behaviour. After the Don defeat, his corps gradually moved to the west, so he was in Germany when the War finished. In Germany he got into American captivity.

=== His activities under the communist dictatorship ===
Having arrived home from the captivity in 1945 and started to work in the press of the order called Clarisseum. Besides, he took an active part in teaching young people in the Christian way, especially as the leader of the local group of Young Catholic Workers' National Association (KIOE) in Rákospalota. He continued this activity even when the Home Office officially banned KIOE in the summer of 1946. He committed himself to the Salesian order permanently on 24 July the same year.

He passed the typographer master exam in autumn, 1948. The Clarisseum was a great opportunity for the education of young people, because this building did not only give home to the order's press but also to a foster-home which started as an orphanage in 1882 by countess Károlyi (née Clarisse Kornis). This building had a big park and a house serving as a scouts' home. The Salesian boys' foster-home worked here from 1925 to 1950, and it admitted orphans as well as children of the poorest families.

In 1950, the state banned the operation of the religious orders, and the violent dissolution affected the Salesian order too. Initially, István Sándor could work as a vestryman, but, beside this, he also continued dealing with the youth underground. He organized excursions and meetings in private flats, and he taught religion too.

In 1949, when a party guard was created from the conscripted staff of the Internal Security Corps (ÁVH) following a three-month training, many of this guard were young people having grown up in orphanages. For this reason, a few of István Sándor's friends were also chosen into this guard, and some of them continued to keep in touch with him.

At the end of February 1951, ÁVH was informed about a part of István Sándor's illegal activity, so they began to shadow him in secret. After he had been confidentially apprised of this by a friend, the leaders of the order organised the flight abroad for him. He was already near the western border of Hungary when he changed his mind and decided he would rather undertake martyrdom than leave the youth in his care alone.

After returning to Budapest, he changed his name to Kiss István to avoid being arrested. He started to work for Persil Works and was living in his fellow brother's flat in secret. He had received an award for the cultural education of the workers in Persil Works.

=== The Party Guard Lawsuit and Sándor's death ===
By 1952, it became widely known that the name István Kiss actually hides István Sándor incognito. ÁVH was also informed about the fact that one of the members of the guard responsible for the protection of the top party leaders was actively in touch with him, a monk doing illegal activities.

This was regarded as such a grave crime that he was arrested for the provocation of ÁVH officers on 28 July 1952. In the jail, he had been beaten several times, but could not be forced to make a confession. After weeks of hearings, he was tried along with 15 other people (nine ÁVH soldiers, five Catholic priests and two civilians including a 15-year-old high school girl). The Budapest Court of Military reached a verdict in a secret trial held from 28 to 30 October 1952. The high school girl received eight years in prison, four people including István Sándor were sentenced to death by hanging, and the others to 5–15 years (125 years altogether) in prison. (The sentence of one of the convicts was modified to life imprisonment later on.) István Sándor and his two fellow inmates' requests of amnesty were rejected on 12 March 1953. They were executed three months later, on 8 June 1953.

A long time had passed after his arrest before his family was informed about what had happened to him. His father received a notification in 1955 which read that his son had been sentenced to death for conspiracy against democracy and the sentence had been executed.

Sándor was rehabilitated in 1994 by a Budapest court.

== Beatification ==
Sándors death is recognised as martyrdom by the Catholic Church. He was beatified on 19 October 2013 in Budapest, before St. Stephen's Basilica in Budapest through Cardinal Angelo Amato, Prefect of the Congregation for the Causes of Saints.

== See also ==
- European Day of Remembrance for Victims of Stalinism and Nazism

== Sources ==
- Zsédely Gyula SDB: Sándor István SDB vértanú. Don Bosco Kiadó, 2002, ISBN 9638456906
- Szőke János: Sándor István vértanú, Don Bosco Kiadó, 2011, ISBN 9789639956186
- Depaula Flavio SDB: Beatificazione del Servo di Dio Stefano Sándor. Új Ember, Debrecen 2013.
- Lengyel Erzsébet: Szaléziak Magyarországon, Don Bosco Kiadó, Budapest 2013, ISBN 9789639956285
