= Don Bosco Technical Institute, Victorias =

Roman Catholic school in Negros Occidental, Philippines

Don Bosco Technical Institute of Victorias Inc.

Location
- Victorias, Negros Occidental; Philippines
- Coordinates: 10°52′59″N 123°04′07″E

Information
- Type: Private Catholic Salesian Non-profit Coeducational Basic education institution
- Motto: Altiora Quaero (Latin) (To Seek For Higher Things)
- Religious affiliations: Roman Catholic ((Salesian))
- Established: 1951; 75 years ago
- Founder: Salesians of the Society of Saint John Bosco
- Enrollment: Approx. 712
- Campus: Urban, 5.9 hectares (59,000 m^{2})
- Colors: Blue and gray
- Mascot: Gray Wolf named Grigio
- Affiliations: PAASCU; TESDA
- Website: www.donboscovictorias.org

Don Bosco Technical Institute of Victorias Inc., also known as Don Bosco Victorias, is a private Catholic Salesian co-educational technical basic education institution run by the Salesians of the Society of Saint John Bosco in Victorias City, Negros Occidental, Philippines. It was founded in 1951 by the (Salesians). The school is rooted on Catholic values.

Being a technical school its students can graduate in four years with a high school diploma and a certificate indicating the technology course taken by combining college-preparatory academic courses and technical education. Before going on to Grade 9, the student must choose from three technology courses to continue with throughout the next two years.

The school is located in Victorias City, 34 kilometers away from Bacolod City, the capital of the province of Negros Occidental. The school is situated in a 4 hectares (40,000 m^{2}) campus near one of the biggest sugar milling companies in the world, Victorias Milling Company (VMC).

== History ==
Don Bosco Technical Institute-Victorias was founded in 1951 in Victorias City, Negros Occidental. It is the second Salesian educational institution founded in the Philippines. St. John Bosco Academy (Don Bosco Technical Institute, Tarlac) which was established in 1947 in Tarlac, Tarlac was the first to be established, and subsequently followed by other Don Bosco schools in Mandaluyong (1953), Cebu (1954), Makati (1954) and eventually Pampanga (1956).

The school was initially intended to provide technical education for the sons of Victorias Milling Company (VMC) employees. However, as years passed by, the school decided to accept boys outside of VMC.

It was named after the founder of the Salesian Society, John Bosco, who was a 19th-century Italian priest who established technical schools to give boys the skills they need to be craftsmen and leaders.

== Sports & extra curricular activities ==
Don Bosco Technical Institute-Victorias offers extracurricular activities, as well as sports. The sports program includes football, basketball, volleyball, table tennis, badminton, taekwondo and track and field. Extracurricular activities include the student government, the Unifying Circle of Don Bosco (UCDB), the school ministry, the Salesian Youth Movement (SYM), the school paper, the Excelsior and academic clubs. The school also requires the senior students to have their Citizens Advancement Training (CAT).

In February 2 to February 4, 2007, Don Bosco Victorias hosted the Regional Boscolympics, participated by Don Bosco Technical Institute-Victorias, Don Bosco Technical College–Cebu, St. Louis School-Don Bosco (Dumaguete), and Don Bosco Boy's Home Lilo-an (Cebu).

== Grade School ==
There are two sections per grade level in the grade school located in the same building where the offices of the rector, economist and HROD are found.

== High school ==
There are three sections per year level in the high school located in the same building where the offices of the accountant, faculty, salesian pastoral animators, discipline moderator, assistant principal and principal are found.

== Senior High School ==
Don Bosco Technical Institute – Victorias offers basic education for elementary and secondary levels in accordance to the DepEd's K-12 Program. The secondary level offers an academic-technical program aligning itself to the thrust for productive, relevant and quality technical-vocational education by the Department of Education (DepEd Order No. 37, series of 2005). The presence of both technical and academic curricula makes the student workload heavy and the schedule tight. Hence, students who cannot satisfactorily meet the demands of such a curriculum will be advised to transfer to another suitable school. DBTI offers elementary and secondary curricular programs as approved by the Department of Education (DepEd). In 2012, DBTI has started implementing the K-12 Program of the DepEd.

== Administration ==
- Principal : Fr. Norman Broderick Segovia, S.D.B.
- Deputy Principal: Paul Ray Mark N. Salsag
- Assistant Principal Senior High: Ma. Regina B. Escleva
- Assistant Principal Junior High: Jona P. Castro
- Assistant Principal Elementary: Maria Victoria A. Segaya
- School Rector/School Head: Fr. Norman Broderick Segovia, S.D.B.
- School Administrator: Bro. Edward Q. Villordon, SDB
- School Secretary: Jayru Carl Jalandra
