= Don Bosco School, Manila =

Roman Catholic school in Manila, Philippines

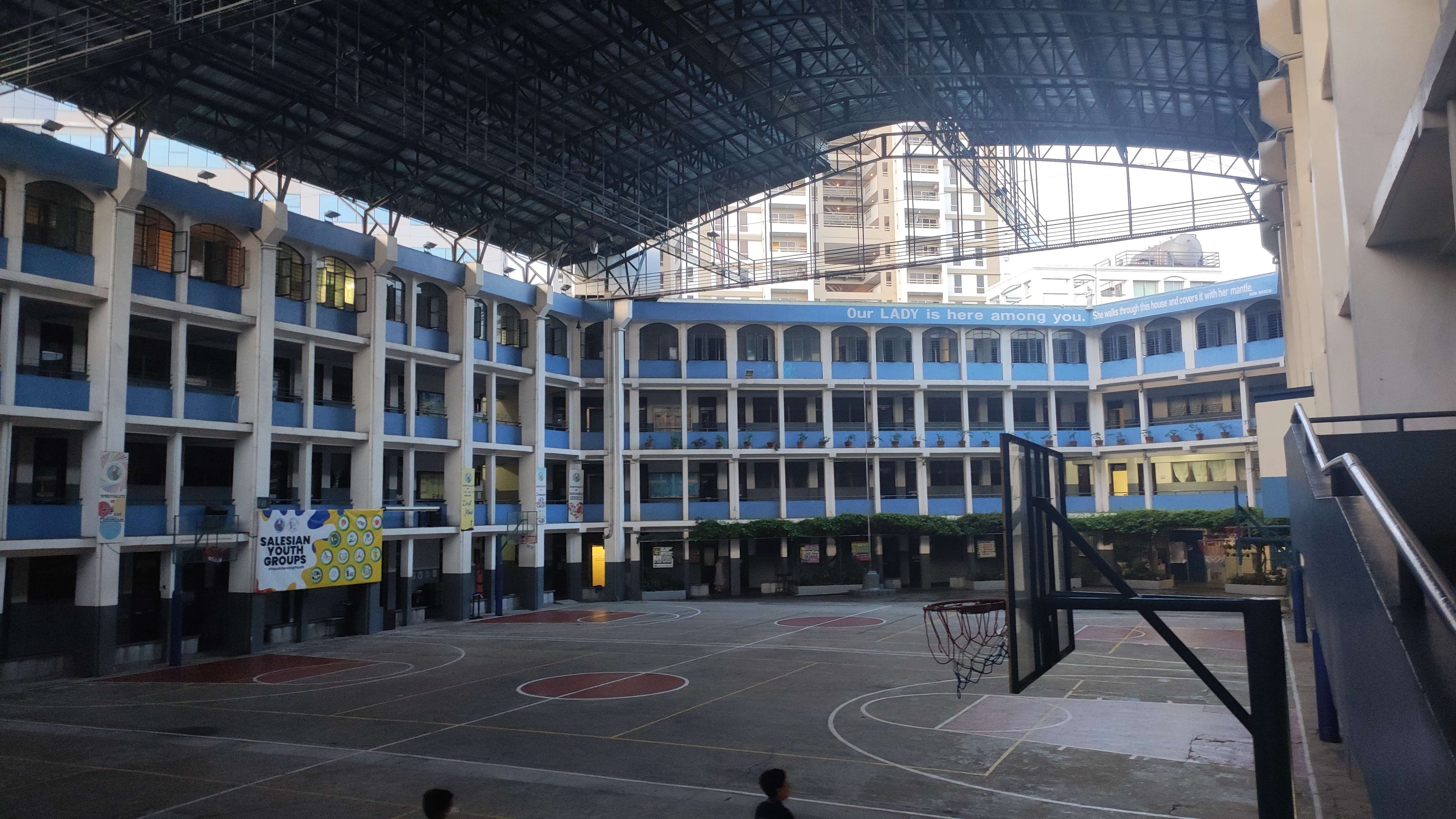
- Don Bosco School quadrangle

Location
- 3500 V. Mapa Extension, Santa Mesa, Manila, National Capital Region; Philippines; 14°35′47″N 121°01′15″E

Information
- Type: Private, Catholic, Salesian and coeducational
- Motto: Run, Jump, Play but never sin!
- Established: 1989; 37 years ago
- School number: 406351
- Director: Sr. Debbie S. Ponsaran, FMA
- Principal: Mary Grace C. Montenegro
- Grades: 12
- Average class size: 30
- Education system: Preventive System
- Language: English, Filipino
- Area: 5,600 m²
- Colors: Navy blue, white
- Song: Alma Mater Song
- Nickname: Bosconians
- Accreditation: PAASCU
- Newspaper: The DBS Sparks
- Affiliation: Roman Catholic (Salesian Sisters)
- Website: www.dbsmanila.online

Don Bosco School Manila (full school name: Don Bosco School (Salesian Sisters), Inc. - Manila, also known as DBS Manila), is an educational institution owned and operated by the Daughters of Mary Help of Christians (FMA) in the National Capital Region of the Philippines. Don Bosco School Manila offers co-educational education for primary (grade school) and secondary education (high-school and senior high school). Don Bosco School also offers night school (Alternative Learning System).

== History ==
School Hymn of Don Bosco School Manila (The Alma Mater Song)

Prior to its construction, the land on which Don Bosco School Manila is presently situated on, used to be a glade with a few banana trees.

Don Bosco School Manila opened in 1989, it first serviced elementary students and faculty from Don Bosco Technical College (DBTC) in Mandaluyong as part of a "phase in-and-out agreement" (stipulating the temporary schooling of elementary DBTC students) between the two entities that jointly administered the school — Salesians of Don Bosco (SDB) and Daughters of Mary Help of Christians (Salesian Sisters of Don Bosco).

In April 1993, DBTC - Mandaluyong and the Salesians of Don Bosco terminated its temporary phase in-and-out agreement with the completion of its last 4th grade batch, who were subsequently transferred back to DBTC - Mandaluyong for high school. Faculty members who were temporarily transferred to DBS Manila were offered a choice as to their preferred employer.

Thus in 1994, the school began its operations as a separate educational institution, officially registering itself with its present-day name,"Don Bosco School (Salesian Sisters), Inc", now solely administered by the Salesian Sisters of Don Bosco. In 1996, the school held its first Grade School Commencement Exercises with 59 graduates.

In 2000, preparations for a high school level were completed. The institution initially operated as an all-girls school until, in the school year of 2004-2005, male students were accepted enrolment to the 5th grade level. Thereafter, male students in the following school year of school year of 2006–2007 were accepted into high school after a consultation made by the Educating Community Core Group.

In the school year 2010–2011, Don Bosco School began to offer the Alternative Learning System programme.

In the school year of 2013, Don Bosco School became qualified to participate in an educational government subsidy programme, the Educational Service Contracting (ESC) scheme. As a school partaking in the ESC scheme, Don Bosco School receives stipends from the state to subsidise its high school students who are in need of financial assistance.

In the same year, Philippine president Benigno Aquino III signed the K-12 act, adding three extra years to the Philippines' 10 year basic curriculum. This law introduced Senior High School or Grades 11–12 to high school education in both public and private school. The Senior High School department formally opened in June 2016 with its 1st batch of 42 students enrolled under the three academic tracks; Humanities and Social Sciences (HUMSS), Accountancy, Business and Marketing (ABM), Science, Technology and Engineering and Math (STEM).

On the 24th of May, 2019, Don Bosco School Manila was officially accredited by the PAASCU following the approval of its application in 2017.

During the Enhanced Community Quarantine in the Philippines, Don Bosco School resorted to online distance education from 2020 until mid 2023.

In the school year of 2021-2022 saw the enhanced utilisation of the digital education programme "Aralinks" into Don Bosco School Manila's curriculum. In the same school year, coding education was integrated into the curriculum, visual programming languages are taught from grade school to high school.

Starting from the school year of 2026-2027, Don Bosco School Manila began to offer a revised Senior High School programme, pursuant to the new Strengthened Senior High School (SSHS) Curriculum laid out by the Department of Education. In lieu of the now-discontinued traditional and fixed academic strands/tracks (HUMMS, ABM and STEM), the school will now be providing elective subjects. The amount of core subjects have been slashed, and hours for work immersion increased.

== Educational stages ==
=== Grade School (Nursery - Grade 6) ===
Grade school in Don Bosco School covers Nursery until Grade 6 (Although Nursery and Kindergarten are considered pre-school.) Its classrooms can be found on the first and second floors of the school. The curriculum for Grade School in Don Bosco School is primarily focused on basic elementary education with its subjects being; English, Filipino, Science, Mother Tongue, Penmanship, Christian Living Education, Mathematics, MAPEH, GMRC, Araling Panlipunan, and TLE.

=== High School (Grade 7 - Grade 12) ===
High School in Don Bosco School is divided into three; Junior High School (Grades 7-8), High School (Grades 9-10), and Senior High School (Grades 11-12). The curriculum for junior high school (Grades 7-8) and high school (Grades 9-10) is virtually the same with the grade school with the exceptions being; Mother Tongue and Penmanship are removed, GMRC is renamed into RHGP, and different fields of science are studied per quarter in a school year: Earth Science, Chemistry, Physics, and Biology.

== Campus ==
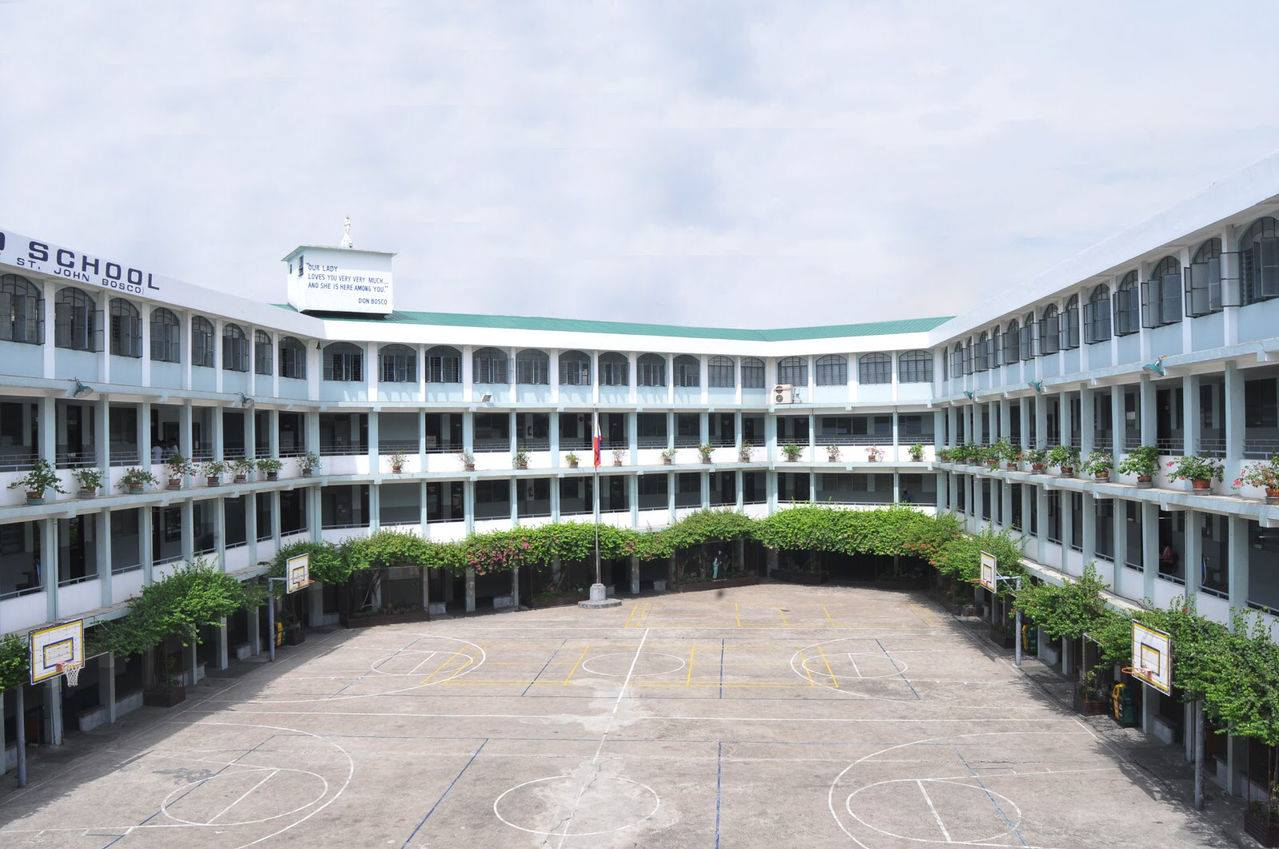
Don Bosco School Quadrangle Pre-Skyroof (2015)

Some of the school's facilities include:

- The Quadrangle bears the shape of an irregular-pentagon, it is a flat space reserved for events and sports. The quadrangle features four poles with basketball rings connected to it for basketball usage. Occasionally, volleyball nets would be placed in the centre for volleyball or badminton.
- The Learning Resource Centre (LRC) or colloquially known to the students as simply The Library, is the main library of the school. Both paper and digital learning resources can be found here.
- The Saint Maria Troncatti Clinic is the main school clinic where medical assistance is available.
- The Audio-Visual Room (AVR), where film projections, talks or special presentations are to be hosted in this room.

== Cocurricular and extracurricular programmes ==
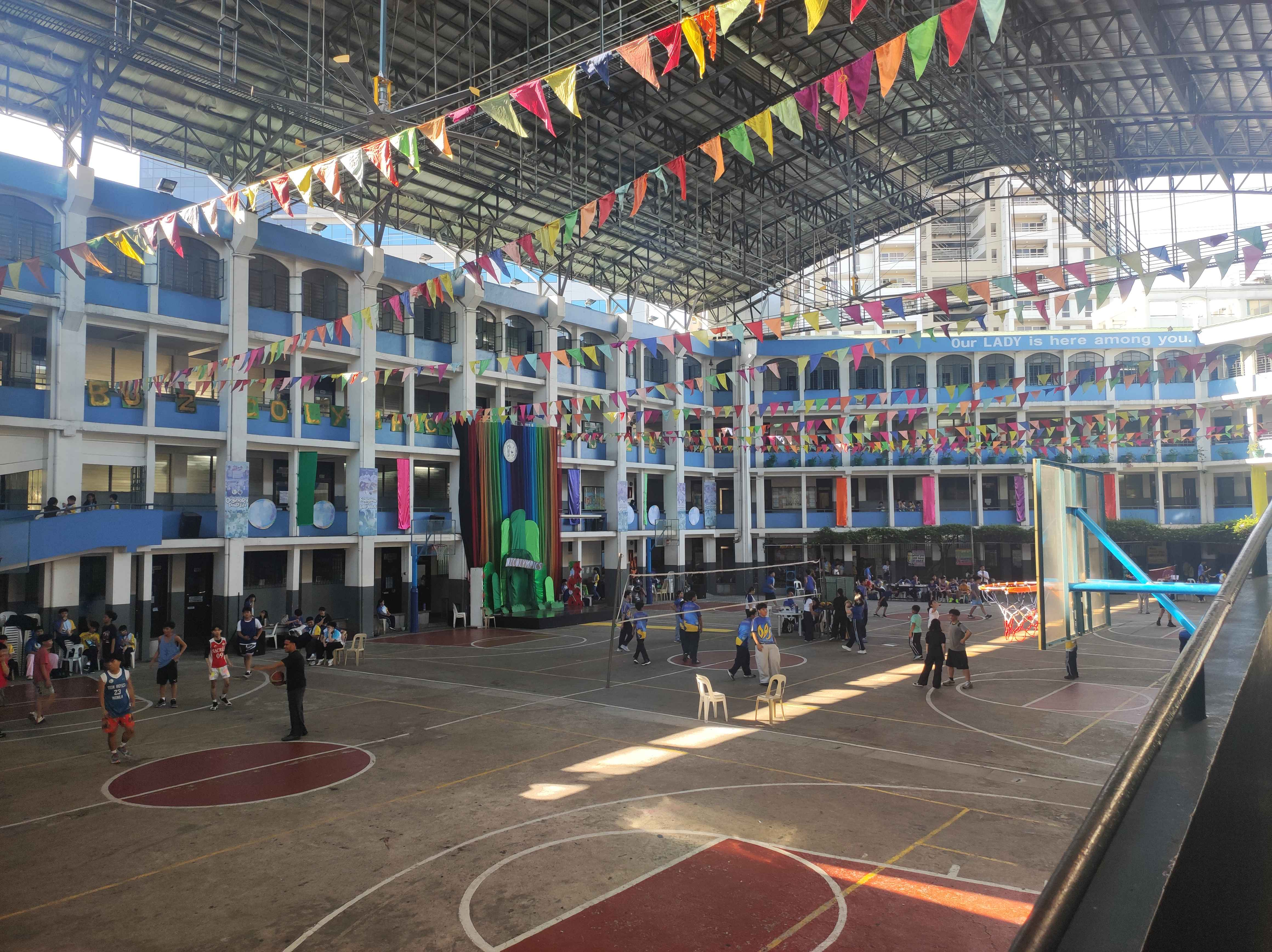
Bosconians participating in the games of the 2026 Boscolympics

Don Bosco School Manila, similarly to its Salesian school pioneers, has the Salesian Youth Movement programme where extracurricular clubs are formed to discover or hone the unique interests or hobbies of the Bosconians. Don Bosco School Manila has multiple Salesian Youth Groups (SYG) or clubs, including but not limited to; Sports, Combo, Knights and Lilies of the Altar, Arts, and Theatre Arts.

The student government of Don Bosco School Manila can be divided into two branches, the Pupils' Leadership Training Club (reserved for Grade School) and the Students' Leadership Training Club (reserved for High School and Senior High School.)

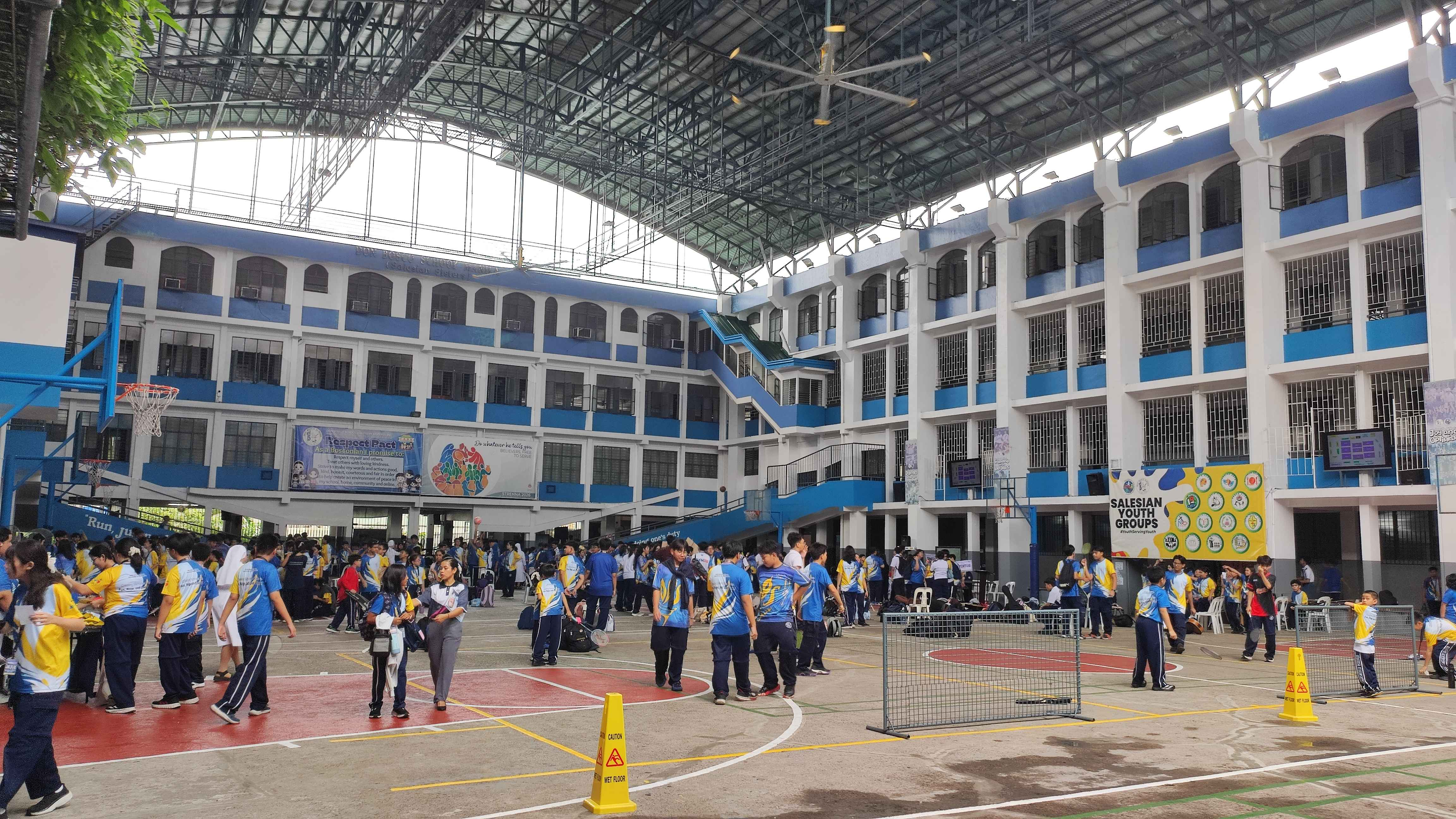
2026 exhibitions by the Salesian Youth Groups in the quadrangle for club fest (club recruitment period)

The popular sports in Don Bosco School Manila are; basketball, volleyball and badminton. Soccer, and table tennis have been observed as minor sports. Chess is also popular amongst the levels.

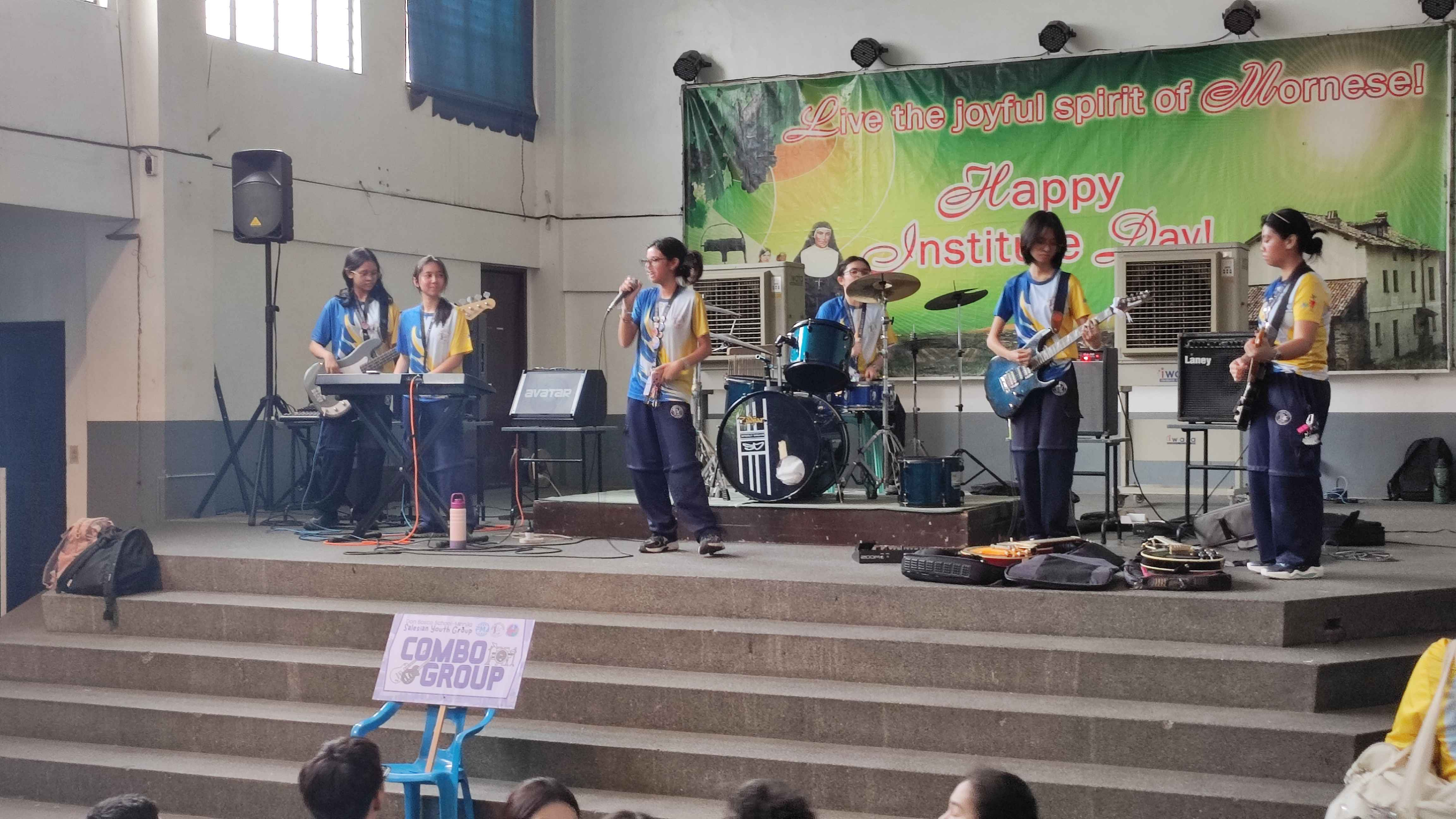
Members of the Salesian Youth Group Combo performing a song in the Mary Mazzarello Hall 2026 for club fest.

Don Bosco School Manila also has varsity teams for basketball, volleyball, and badminton.

Every late-January, a sports week also known as Boscolympics (portmanteau of Bosco and Olympics) occurs when all popular sports are allotted days to have its players compete against each other.

Don Bosco School Manila has a summer school programme during summer breaks, where various courses are offered such as in music tutorials and taekwondo lessons. The school has its own school choir, the Don Bosco School Chorale, and its own school newspaper, The DBS Sparks.

== Seal ==
Seal of Don Bosco School Manila

- The Crown and sceptre symbolises Mary Help of Christians, the mother and teacher in every Salesian school.
- The lily stands for radiant purity, which must be the shining virtue lived to a heroic degree in the daily by every Salesian pupil and educator.
- The rose stands for charity, the love of Christ the Good Shepherd, which impels every Salesian educator to value and see the educative potential in every young person on their road to salvation. It is the same love that challenges the young to respond to God's love by performing their absolute best. It is also this love which impels the young to be good citizens in society and in the church.
- The monogram denoting the school within the FMA group of schools.
- And lastly, the text DON BOSCO SCHOOL and STA. MESA MANILA indicating the location, origin and name of the school.

== Gallery ==
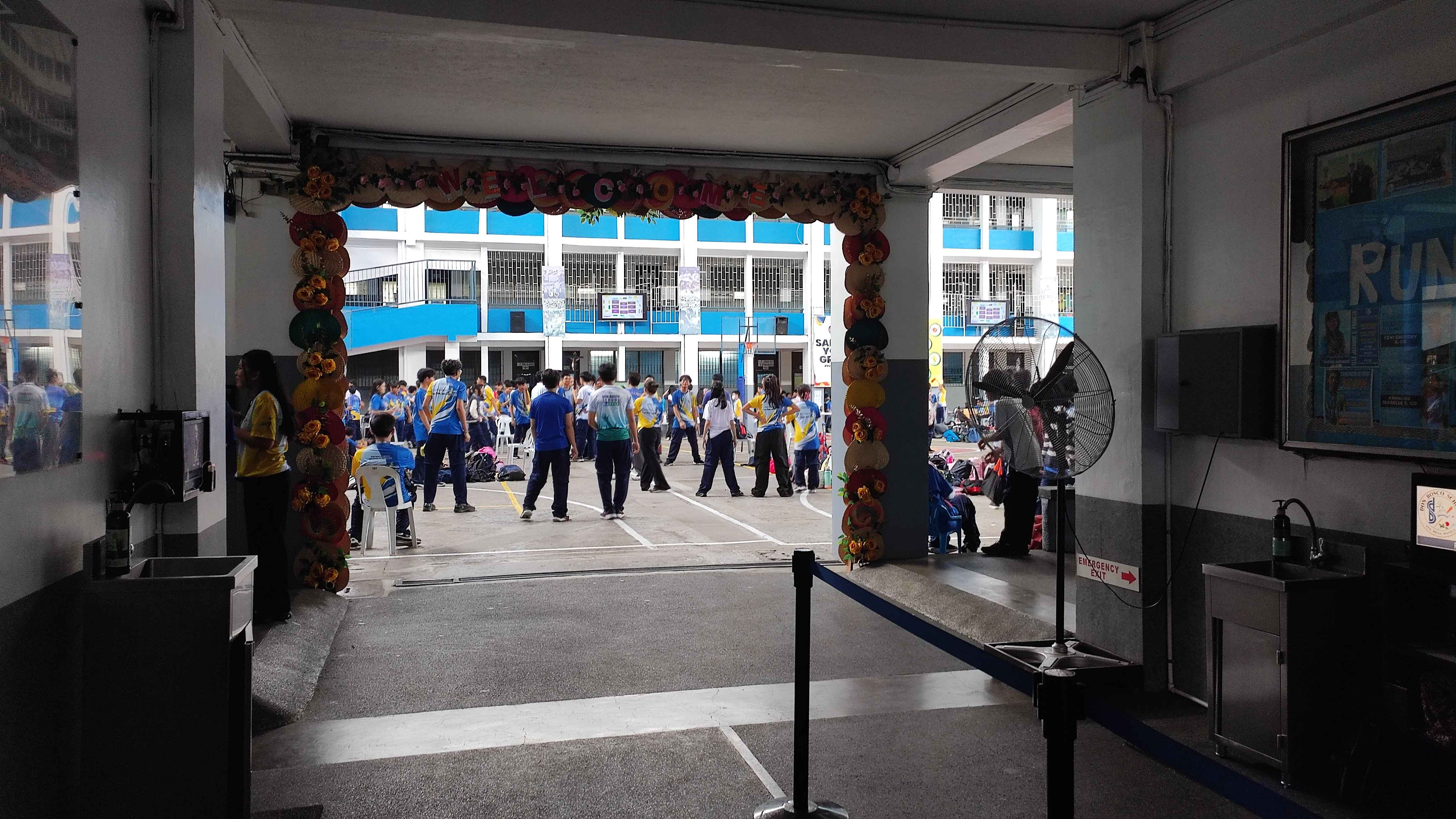
Photo of the main entrance

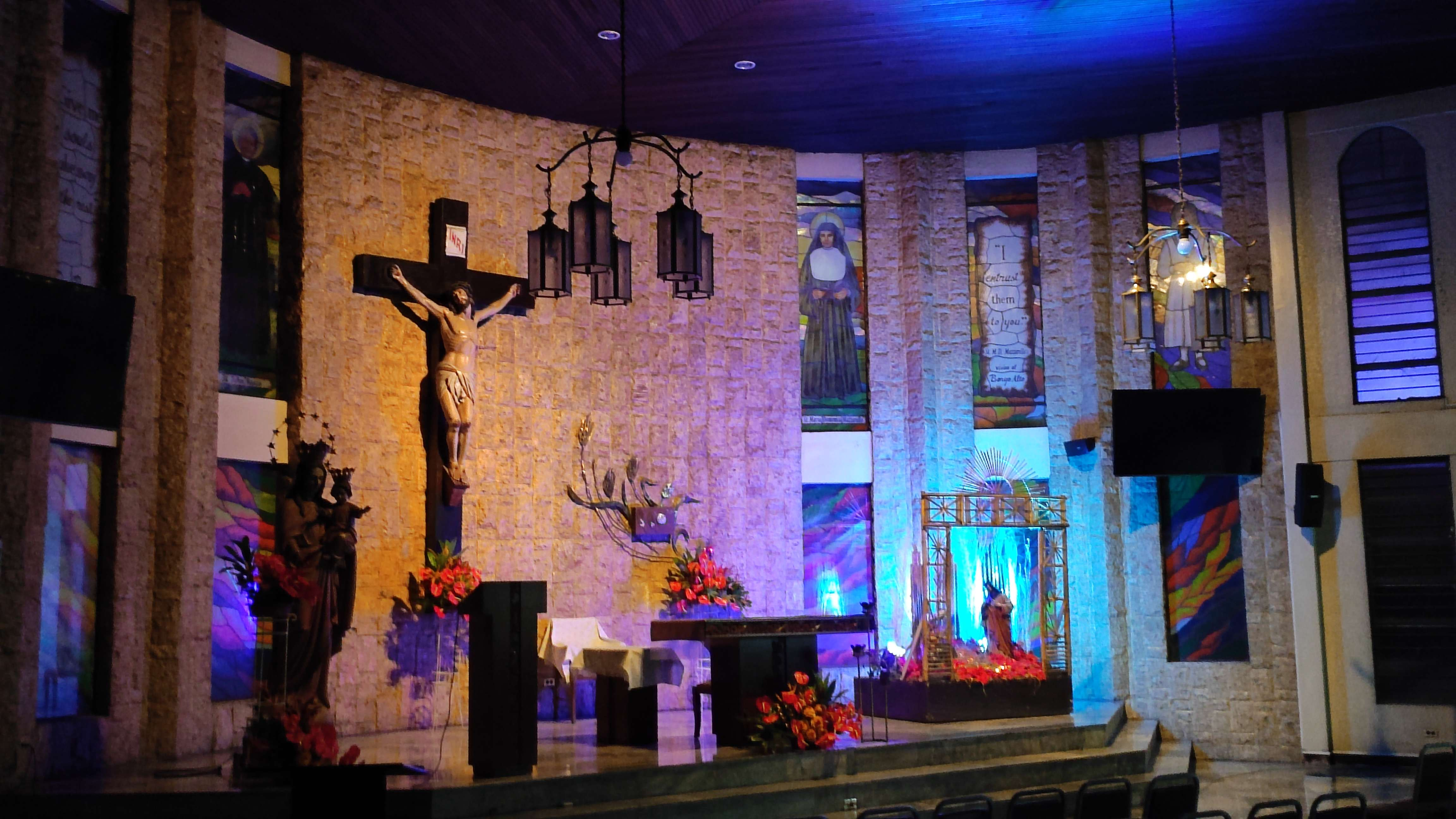
Photo of the Chapel

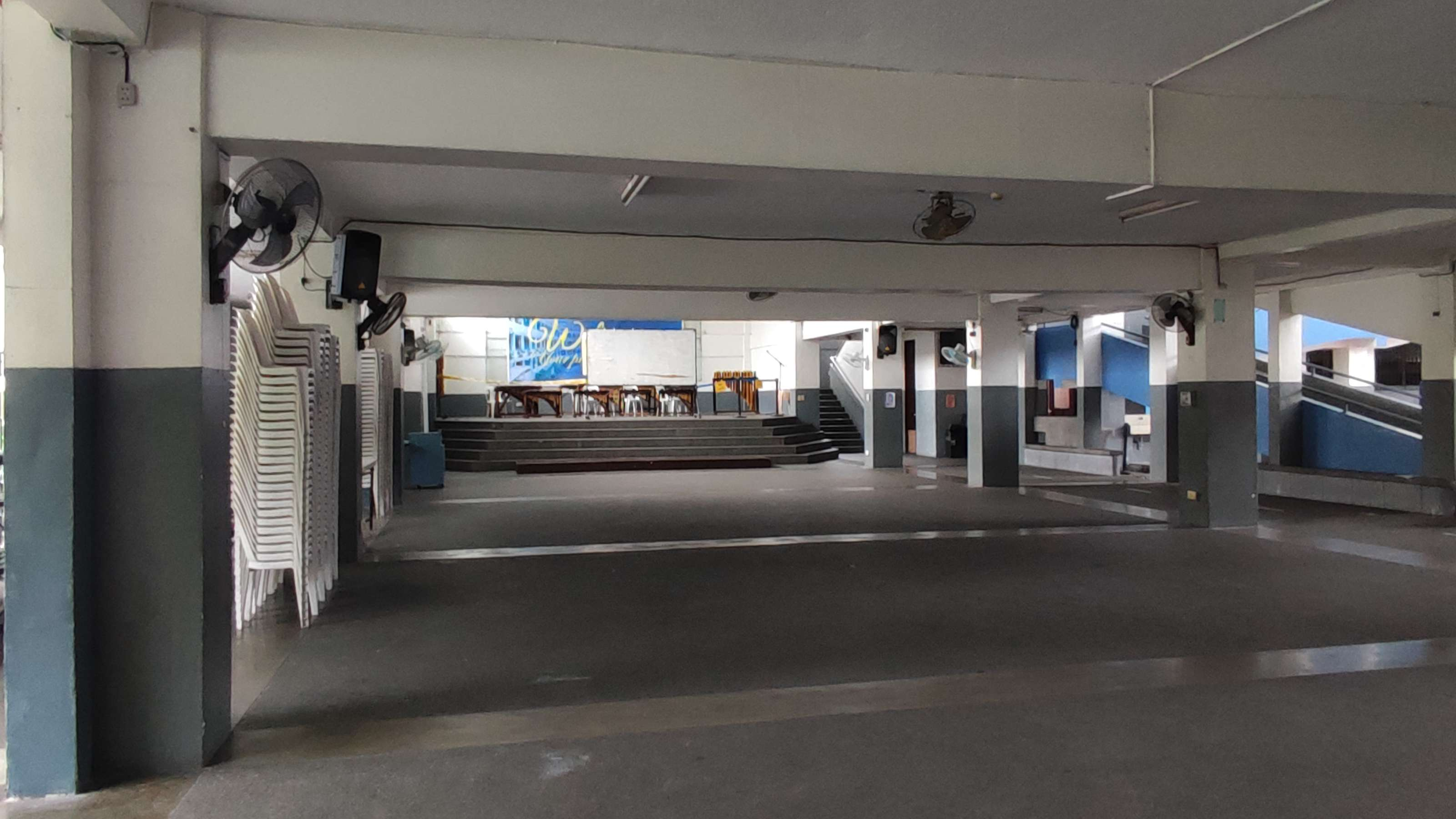
Photo of the Mary Domenica Mazzarello Hall

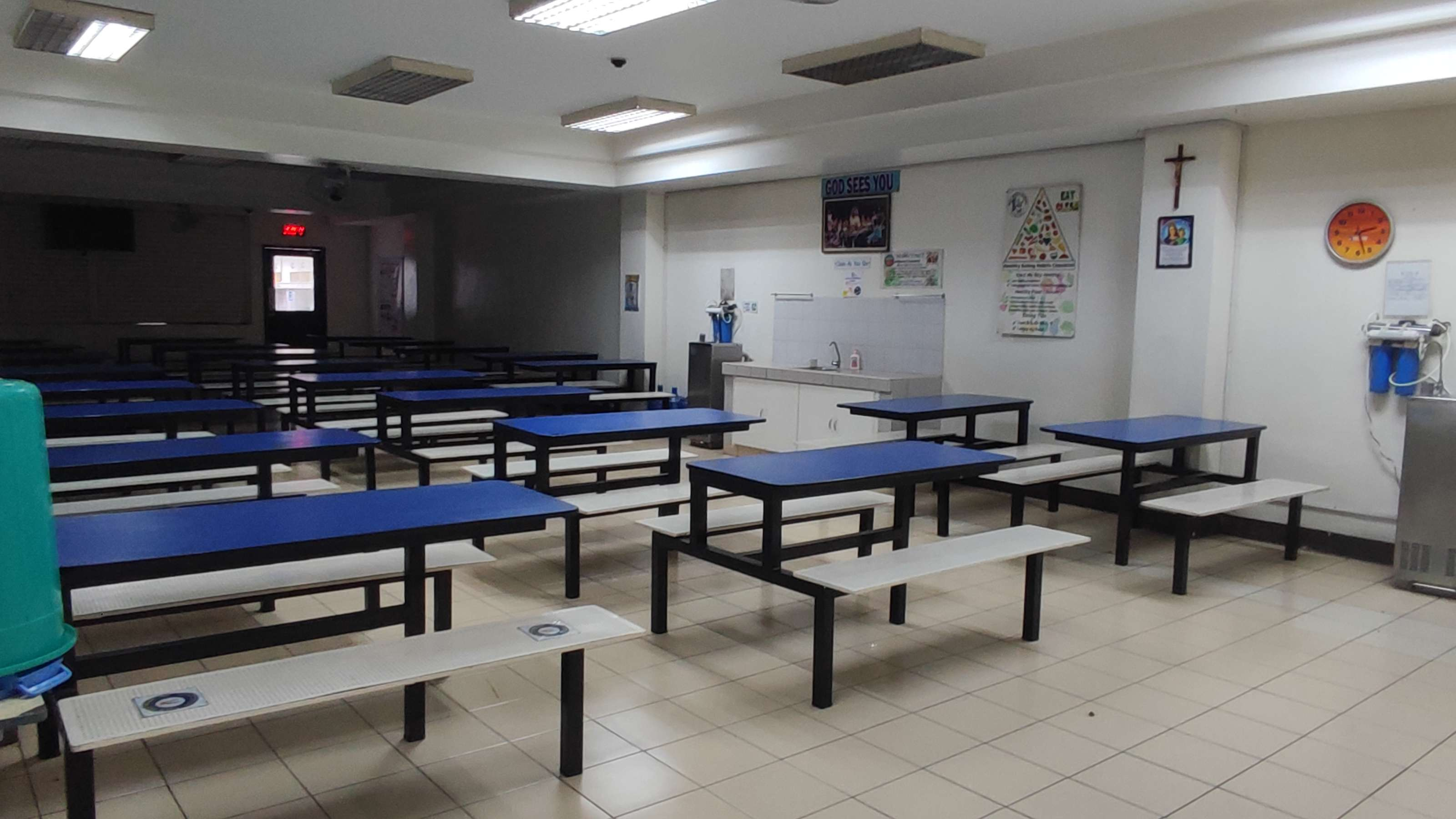
Photo of the Blessed Eusebia Palomino Canteen (Canteen B)

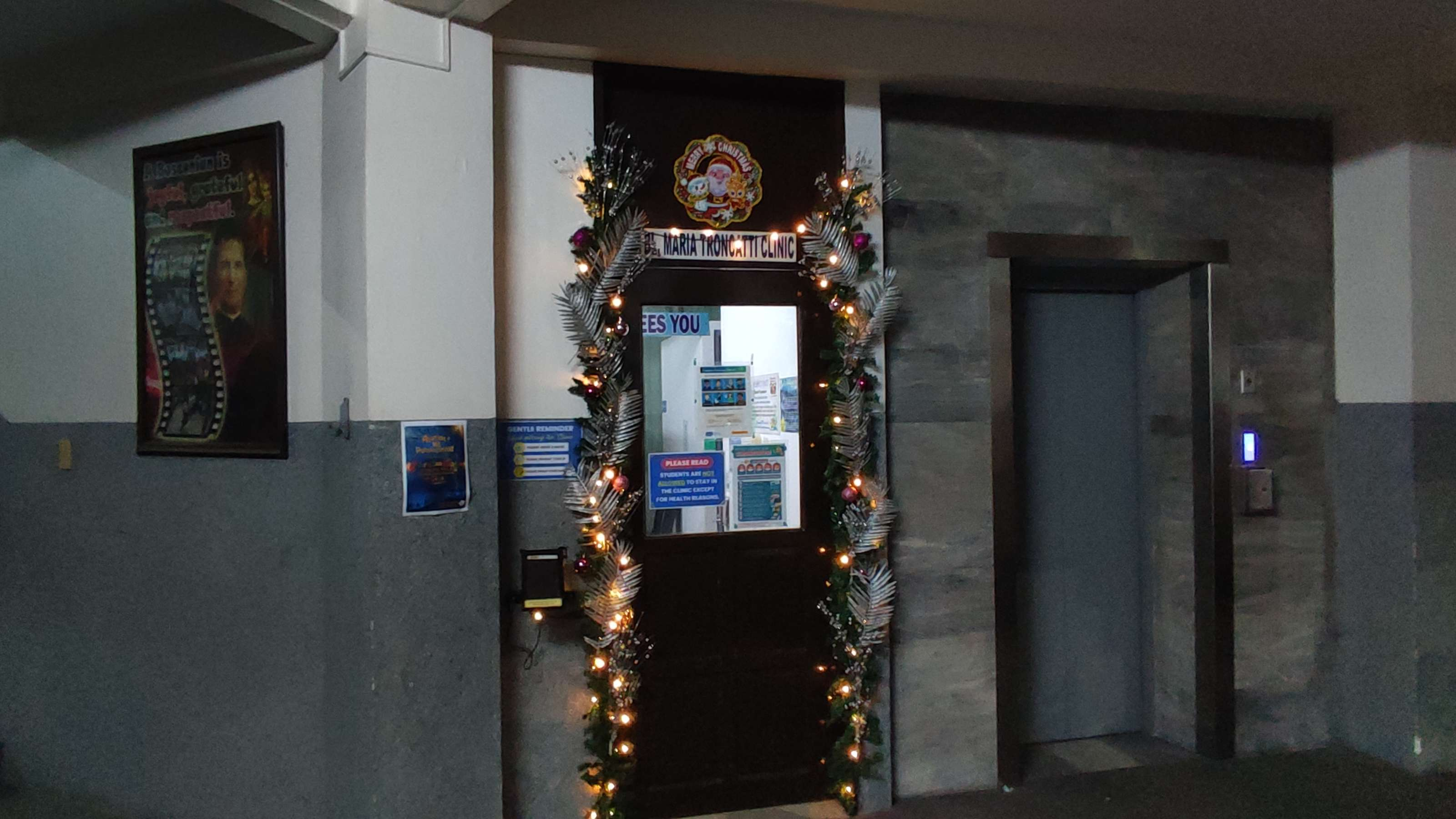
Photo of the clinic

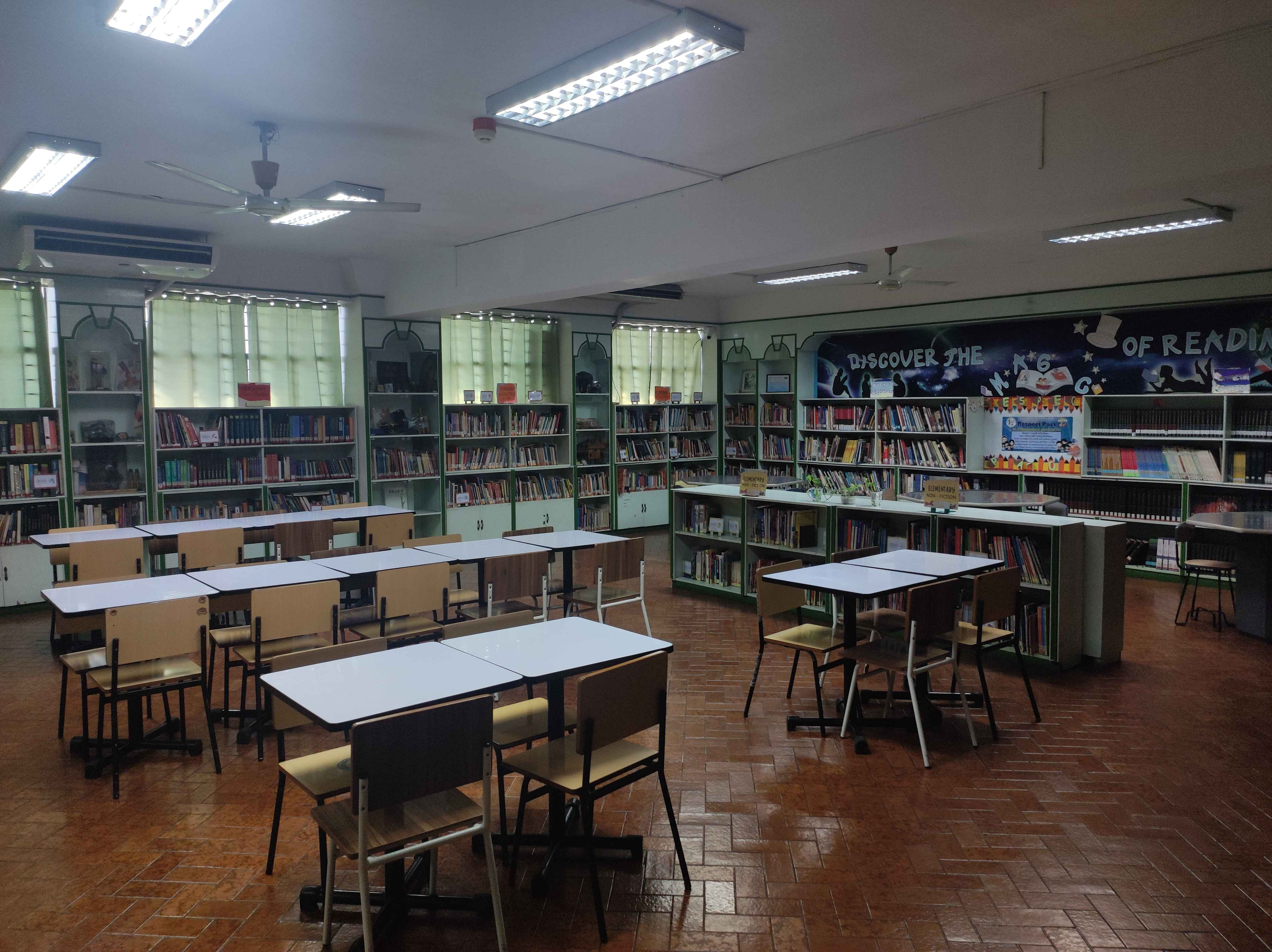
Photo of the Learning Resource Centre or the Library
