= Carlo Braga =

Italian priest (1889–1971)

Servant of God Carlo Braga SDB
- Church: Roman Catholic Church

Orders
- Ordination: 11 April 1914

Personal details
- Born: 23 May 1889 Tirano, Sondrio, Kingdom of Italy
- Died: 3 January 1971 (aged 81) Makati, Philippines
- Buried: Salesian Cemetery, Diocesan Shrine of Mary, Help of Christians, Canlubang, Calamba, Laguna
- Occupation: Priest

Carlo Braga (23 May 1889 – 3 January 1971) was a Salesian religious priest. He is also sometimes known as "the little Don Bosco of China" for his missionary works towards the children in China. He died in the Philippines in 1971.

== Biography ==
Don Braga was born in Tirano, Sondrio, on May 23, 1889. He grew up motherless since childhood and because of this his education was entrusted to the Salesians of Don Bosco in Sondrio. When he was seventeen, he entered the Salesians and took religious vows in Turin, Italy and he completed his studies in philosophy in Valsalice High School, where his instructors were Don Cimatti, the future apostle of Japan, and Don Cojazzi, a well known apostle of young people.

He was ordained on 11 April 1914.

With the outbreak of the First World War, he was recruited in the army; he then contracted Spanish flu. He received a missionary cross in April 1919.

He applied to be sent on a mission in the Far East. He arrived in China in September 1919. When he reached Shiu Chow, in southern China, the first Salesian Bishop and Martyr, Monsignor Luigi Versiglia, who immediately sensed the good educational qualities of Don Braga, the Bishop entrusted the direction of the "Don Bosco Middle School" to him.

Don Braga, at the age of 40, was called to replace the Salesian Provincial, Fr Canazei, who was elected as bishop. The Salesian missions in China under his leadership brought forth orphanages and schools in Macao and in Hong Kong arose five large and modern schools with a student population of about 10,000 students.

He pushes bravely in northern China and implants the Salesian work in the capital Beijing: the work for orphans, for the poor and abandoned boys in those years many wandering the streets or starving. In Beijing he realizes the prophetic dream of Don Bosco who many years before had seen the Salesians settle in the vast capital.

The Salesian work of Don Braga was interrupted by the Chinese Communist Revolution. As a consequence, education, charitable activities and evangelization were brought to an end. He then turned his attention to the Philippines and Indochina, where here he opened a Salesian school. Meanwhile, in 1955 he was elected Provincial. In the Philippines, the Salesian presence expanded considerably.

Don Braga was regarded as a person of optimism, kindness, and a cheerful disposition. His religious commitment was valued by his fellow missionaries and served as a source of inspiration.

On 3 January 1971, he died at the age of 81 in Bacolor, Pampanga, Philippines. His remains were interred at the Salesians' Cemetery at the compound of the Diocesan Shrine of Mary, Help of Christians in Canlubang, Calamba, Laguna.

== Beatification ==
The cause for his beatification is already in the preliminary stages of the diocesan investigation but has not yet received the decree nihil obstat from the Congregation for the Causes of Saints. As of January 2019, he has been declared a Servant of God.
