= Vincent Cimatti =

Italian Roman Catholic bishop

Venerable Vincent Cimatti SDB
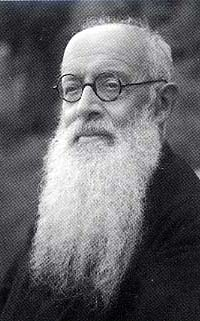
- Born: 15 July 1879; Celle, Faenza, Ravenna, Kingdom of Italy
- Died: 6 October 1965 (aged 86); Tokyo, Japan

Vincent Cimatti, SDB was a Roman Catholic priest, bishop, prefect apostolic and Salesian provincial to Japan. He is founder of the Caritas Sisters of Jesus. He is the brother of Maria Raffaella Cimatti, a member of the Hospitaler Sisters of Mercy, who was beatified by the Catholic Church in 1996.

== Life ==
Cimatti was born on 15 July 1879 in Faenza, Ravenna, Italy to James and Rosa Pasi, the youngest of six children. He was ordained a priest at the age of 24. He led a group of Salesians to start a Salesian mission in Japan and was appointed prefect apostolic in 1935.

Cimatti died on 6 October 1965 in Japan. His body was re-exhumed in 1977 and found to be perfectly intact. His remains are kept in a crypt in Chofu. He was declared venerable on 21 December 1991 by Pope John Paul II.
