= Luigi Variara =

Italian Roman Catholic priest

Blessed Luigi Variara S.D.B.
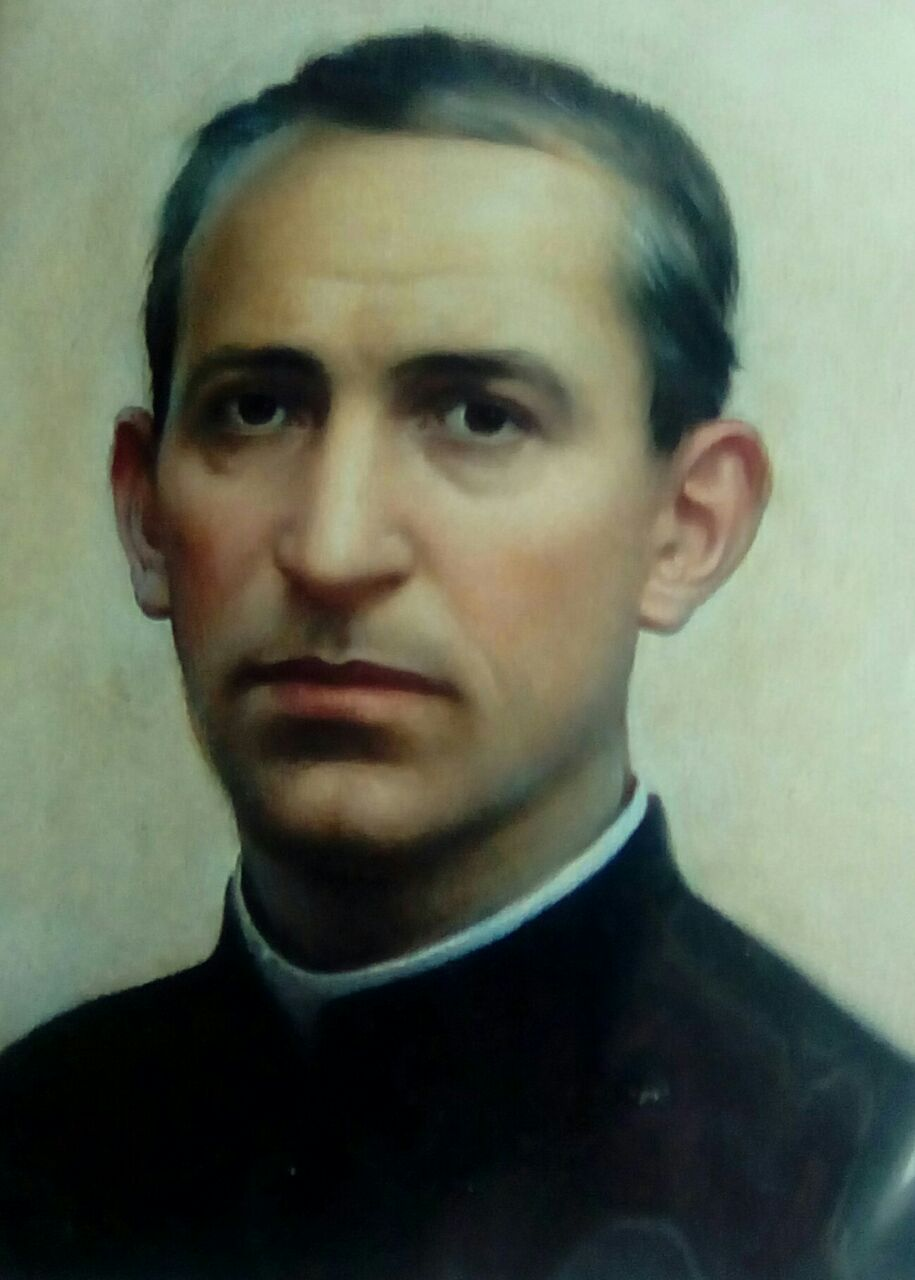

Priest
- Born: 15 January 1875; Viarigi, Asti, Kingdom of Italy
- Died: 1 February 1923 (aged 48); Cúcuta, Colombia
- Venerated in: Roman Catholic Church
- Beatified: 14 April 2002, Saint Peter's Square, Vatican City by Pope John Paul II
- Feast: 1 February; 15 January (Salesians)
- Attributes: Cassock
- Patronage: Daughters of the Sacred Hearts of Jesus and Mary; Missionaries

Luigi Variara (15 January 1875 – 1 February 1923) was an Italian Roman Catholic priest and a professed member of the Salesians of Don Bosco. He served for most of his life as part of the missions in Colombia where he worked with lepers and the children of outcast lepers. He was ordained as a priest while serving there and made it his mission to provide both relief and consolation.

He established his own religious congregation - the Daughters of the Sacred Hearts of Jesus and Mary - with the intention of allowing lepers and the children of lepers the chance to enter the religious life.

Pope John Paul II beatified Variara on 14 April 2002.

== Life ==
Luigi Variara was born in 1875 in Asti to Pietro Variara and Livia Bussa.

Variara entered a Salesian Oratory in Turin at the age of 12 for studies. His father heard John Bosco preach in 1856 and took Variara to Valdocco to complete his studies; Variara met Bosco for a brief period in 1887 before Bosco died in 1888 and the encounter with Bosco left a deep imprint upon Variara. When the two met, Bosco gazed into Variara which the latter took as a confirmation of his future Salesian vocation, considering Bosco's gaze as the approval for such a decision. After Variara finished high school he asked permission to become a Salesian.

Variara joined the Salesians of Don Bosco on 17 August 1891 and commenced his period of novitiate. Variara underwent philosophical studies at Valsalice where he met the Andrew Beltrami who died not long after; Variara was inspired with Beltrami's docile attitude to his suffering. He made his solemn profession of his religious vows in the hands of Bosco's successor Michael Rua. In 1894 the priest Michele Unia came to look for a cleric to take with him to Colombia to assist at the Salesian missions for the lepers. Out of the 188 candidates Unia was most impressed with Variara and the two embarked and arrived in Colombia in Agua de Dios on 6 August 1894. When Unia chose him out of all others Variara said of it: "I said 'yes', and it seemed to me a dream".

He carried out his apostolate in the leper colonies of Agua de Dios in the mission that numbered 2000 people of whom 800 were lepers that he would tend to. Variara was ordained to the priesthood in 1898 in Colombia. Variara also served for a period of time as the spiritual director to the Sodality of the Children of Mary. He often served in the confessional booth for around four to five hours.

Unia died in 1895 and allowed for Variara to work with his fellow Salesian Father Crippa. In 1905 he established the Father Michele Unia Kindergarten in honor of Unia whom Variara had a great admiration for.

Seeing that the lepers and - indeed the children of lepers - could not enter the religious life he decided at the suggestion of Rua to establish a religious congregation to allow them to do so. He also decided to do this with the permission of the Archbishop of Bogotá Bernardo Herrera Restrepo and formal approval for the establishment allowed for it to be erected as such on 7 May 1905. It received diocesan approval from Restrepo's successor Isamel Perdomo Borrero on 2 October 1930 and the papal decree of praise from Pope Pius XII in 1952; Pope Paul VI granted formal pontifical approval on 6 April 1964.

In 1919 he was diagnosed to have contracted the disease that he had worked alongside for so long; this diagnosis proved to be quite inaccurate. In 1921 he agreed to go to Tariba in Venezuela but arrived in poor health. The doctors there that attended to him requested he go back to Colombia to Cucuta. He died in 1923 in Cucuta; his remains were transferred to Agua de Dios in 1932 where he now rests.

== Legacy ==
At present the congregation that Variara established operates across several continents such as Europe and Africa and spread at a rapid pace across South America where Variara operated. It now operates in states such as Cameroon and Spain.

As of 2005 there have been around 382 religious of the congregation operating in a total of 71 houses.

== Beatification ==
The beatification process was initiated on two fronts in both Bogotá and in Girardot and commenced in a diocesan process that spanned from 10 August 1959 until 12 September 1959 - the beginning of the cause allowed for Variara to be granted the posthumous title Servant of God. The process was declared valid on 21 April 1989 and allowed for the Congregation for the Causes of Saints to initiate their own line of investigation in what was known as the so-called "Roman Phase" of the proceedings.

The postulation later compiled the Positio extolling the works and the virtues of the late Salesian priest and submitted it to Rome in 1989 for further investigation. Pope John Paul II approved these findings and recognized that the late priest had in fact lived a model Christian life of heroic virtue; because of this the pope conferred upon Variara the title of Venerable on 2 April 1993.

The pope also approved a miracle attributed to his intercession and celebrated his beatification on 14 April 2002.

The current postulator of the cause is the Salesian Father Pierluigi Cameroni.
