= Salesians of Don Bosco =

Roman Catholic order

Society of Saint Francis de Sales
- Societas Sancti Francisci Salesii
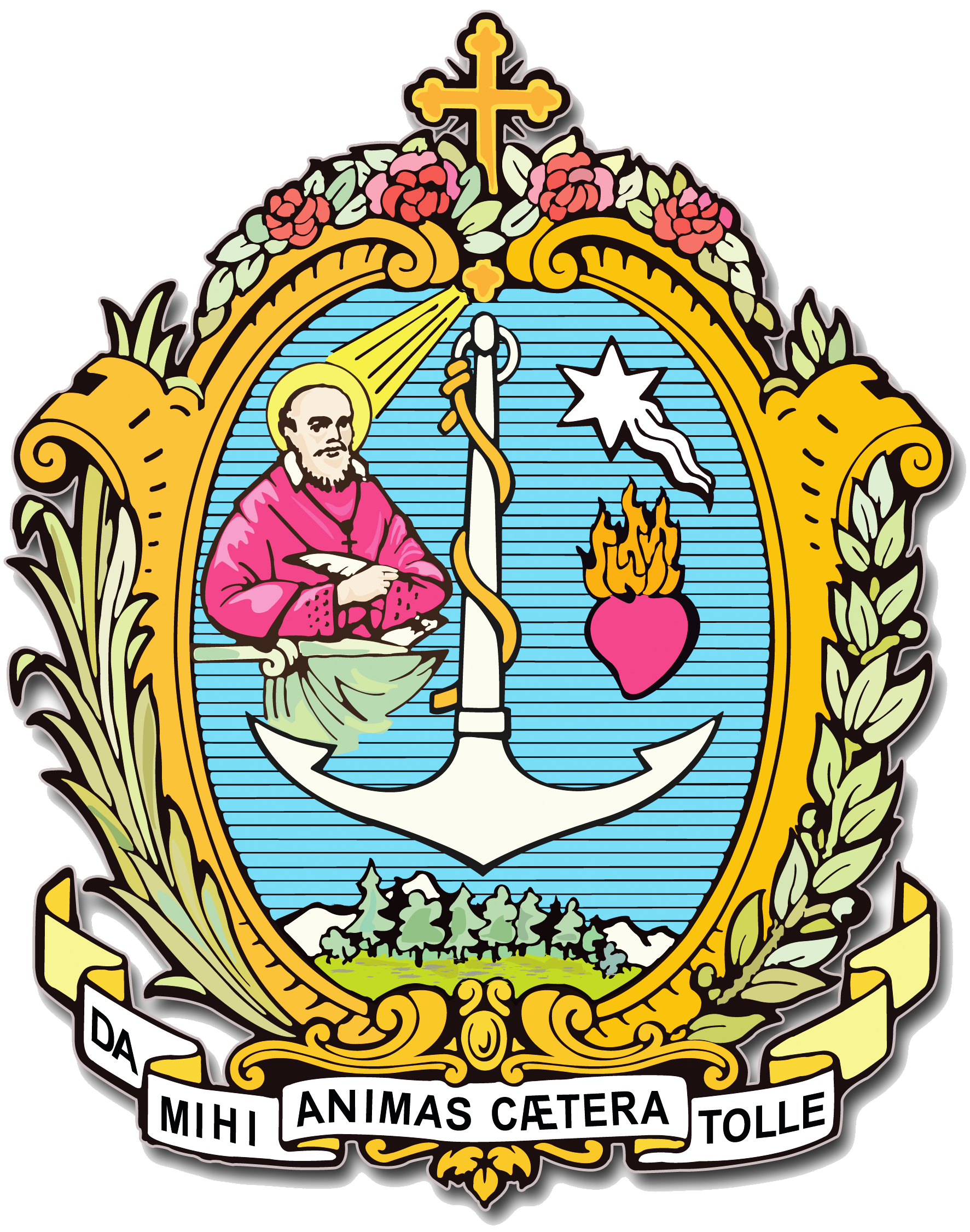
- Coat of arms
- Abbreviation: SDB
- Nickname: Salesians of Don Bosco
- Formation: 18 December 1859; 166 years ago
- Founder: John Bosco
- Founded at: Valdocco, Turin
- Type: Clerical Religious Congregation of Pontifical Right
- Headquarters: Sacro Cuore di Gesù a Castro Pretorio Rome, Italy
- Members: 14,614 (128 bishops, 14,056 priests and 430 novices) (2022)
- Rector Major of the Salesians: Fabio Attard
- Vicar of the Rector Major: Stefano Martoglio
- Website: sdb.org/en

The Salesians of Don Bosco (SDB), formally known as the Society of Saint Francis de Sales (Latin: Societas Sancti Francisci Salesii), is a religious congregation of men in the Catholic Church, founded on 18 December 1859 by the Italian priest John Bosco to help poor and migrant youth during the Industrial Revolution. The congregation was named after Francis de Sales, a 17th-century bishop of Geneva.

The Salesians' charter describes the society's mission as "the Christian perfection of its associates obtained by the exercise of spiritual and corporal works of charity towards the young, especially the poor, and the education of boys to the priesthood". Its associated women's institute is the Salesian Sisters of Don Bosco, while the lay movement is the Association of Salesian Cooperators.

== History ==
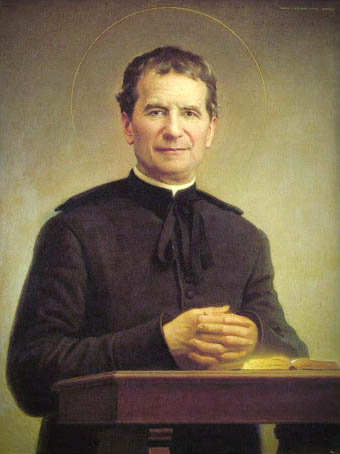
John Bosco, founder of the Society of St. Francis de Sales in 1859

In 1845 Don John Bosco ("Don" being a traditional Italian honorific for priest) opened a night school for boys in Valdocco, now part of the municipality of Turin in Italy. In the following years, he opened several more schools, and in 1857 drew up a set of rules for his helpers. Bosco admired the simple spirituality and philosophy of kindness of Francis de Sales and established the Society of St. Francis de Sales in his honor in 1859.

The rule was approved definitively in 1873 by Pope Pius IX as the Rule of the Society of Saint Francis de Sales. The Society grew rapidly, with houses established in France, and Argentina within a year of the Society's formal recognition. Its official print organ, Salesian Bulletin, was first published in 1877.

Over the next decade the Salesians expanded into Austria, Spain, Chile and several other countries in South America. They started in Punta Arenas, in the Chilean Patagonia (Magallanes Region), Región de Magallanes (Magellan Region / Magallanes Region), arriving with 4 priests led by Father Giuseppe Fagnano. Founded Liceo Salesiano San José (school for boys) on August 7, 1887 in Punta Arenas City. Liceo Salesiano San José is one of the oldest educational institutions in southern Patagonia (Magallanes Region). They expanded very fast opening Liceo María Auxiliadora in March 1889 a new school for girls only. And later 2 new technical schools one for girls only (Instituto Sagrada Familia, founded in August 15th, 1904) and another one for boys only (Instituto Don Bosco, founded in January 5th, 1913). Both, Instituto Sagrada Familia and Instituto Don Bosco, are technical-vocational high schools that teach practical trades and vocational workshops (Administration, Accounting, Early Childhood Education, Education for Childs with Special Needs, Electricity - Electronics - Automotive Mechanics - Industrial Mechanics - Telecommunications) to prepare students to quickly enter the workforce and/or launch their own independent ventures, enabling them to achieve financial autonomy.

In 1893, the Salesians founded in Punta Arenas, in Liceo Salesiano San José the beginnings of the historic Museo Salesiano Maggiorino Borgatello. In 1929 the museum moved to its own dedicated building next to the Mary Help of Christians Sanctuary.

The death of Don Bosco in 1888 did not slow down the Society's growth. The Salesians arrived in Mexico and established their first institution in 1892 and in 1894 arrived in Portugal. By 1911 the Salesians were established throughout the world, including Argentina, Colombia, China, India, South Africa, Tunisia, Venezuela and the United States.

== Present day ==
The Society continues to operate worldwide; in 2021, it counted 14,232 members in 1,703 houses. As of 2023, Salesians are present in more than 130 countries.

== Symbols ==
=== Coat of arms ===
The Salesian coat of arms was designed by Professor Boidi. It was published for the first time in a circular letter of Don Bosco on 8 December 1885. It consists of a shining star, a large anchor, and a heart on fire to symbolize the theological virtues of Faith, Hope and Charity. The figure of Saint Francis de Sales recalls the patron of the society. The small wood in the lower part refers to the founder of the society; the high mountains signify the heights of perfection towards which members strive; the interwoven palm and laurel that enfold the shield on either side are emblematic of the prize reserved for a virtuous and sacrificial life. The motto Da mihi animas, caetera tolle ("Give me souls, take away the rest") is featured at the bottom.

=== Logo ===
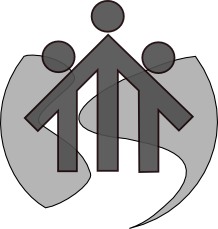
Salesian logo

The Salesian logo is made up of two superimposed images. The logo combines elements from those of the German and Brazilian provinces. The idea of combining the two came out of suggestions from an enquiry about the new logo conducted throughout the Congregation and from contributions by the General Council. It is designed with the central theme "Don Bosco and the Salesians walking with the young through the world." The artistic work of combining the two was carried out by the designer Fabrizio Emigli, from the Litos Company, in Rome.

In the background is a globe to represent the worldwide reach of the Salesians, and a stylized "S" in white is formed within the globe, resembling a snaking road representing an educational journey for the youth.

In the foreground is an arrow pointing upwards, resting on three perpendicular legs on top of which are three closed circles, making a stylized image of three people: the first of these in the middle and taller than the others is the point of the arrow, and the other two beside it appear as it were to be embraced by the central figure. These three stylized figures represent Saint John Bosco reaching out to the young, and his call for Salesians to continue his work. The three stylized figures with the arrow pointing upwards can also be viewed as a house dwelling with a sloping roof and three pillars holding it up, represents John Bosco's pedagogy of Reason, Religion and Loving Kindness.

=== Organization ===
The Salesians of Don Bosco are headed by the Rector Major and the society's general council, while each of the ninety-four geographical provinces is headed by a Provincial. These officers serve six-year terms; the Rector Major and the members of the general council are elected by the General Chapter, which meets every six years or upon the death of the Rector Major. Each local Salesian community is headed by a superior, called a Rector (or more commonly, "Director"), who is appointed to a three-year term and can be renewed for a second three-year term.

Since March 2025, Fabio Attard has been rector major.

== Works ==
Salesian communities primarily operate shelters for homeless or at-risk youths; schools; technical, vocational, and language instruction centers for youths and adults; and boys' clubs and community centers. In some areas they run parish churches. Salesians are also active in publishing and other public communication activities, as well as mission work, especially in Asia (Siberia - in the Yakutsk area), Africa, and South America (Yanomami). The Salesian Bulletin is now published in fifty-two editions, in thirty languages.

In 1988, the Salesians branched to create the Salesian Youth Movement. Then in the 1990s, the Salesians launched new works in the area of tertiary education, and today have a network of over 58 colleges and universities. The official university of the Salesian Society is the Salesian Pontifical University in Rome.

A number of schools and churches established under the Salesians have been at the center of child sex abuse scandals, including Mary Help of Christians in Tampa, Florida. Due to ongoing sexual assault lawsuits and settlements, several boarding schools were closed.

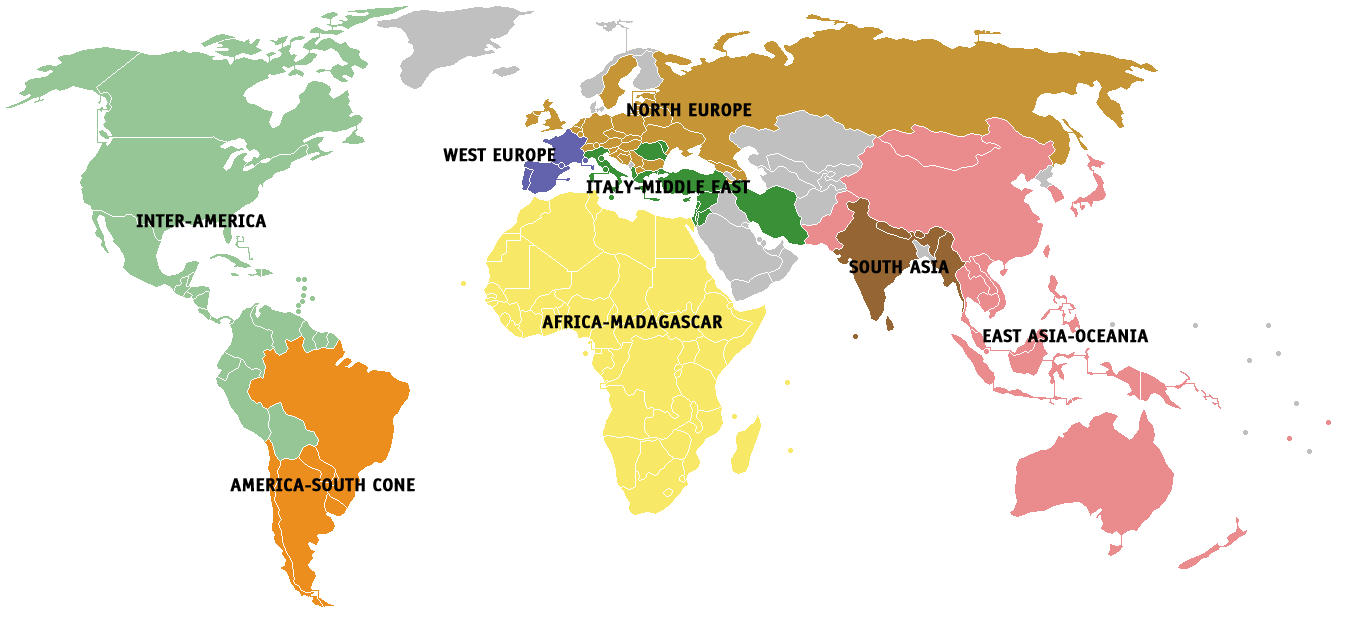
Map showing the regional organization of the Salesians of Don Bosco, dotted with the location of the headquarters of Salesian provinces and vice-provinces.

== Saints, Blesseds, and other holy people ==
Saints

- John Bosco (16 August 1815 – 31 January 1888), founder of the Society, canonized on 1 April 1934
- Dominic Savio (2 April 1842 – 9 March 1857), student of John Bosco, canonized on 12 June 1954
- Luigi Versiglia (5 June 1873 – 25 February 1930), Apostolic Vicar of Shaoguan and Martyr of China, canonized on 1 October 2000
- Callisto Caravario (18 June 1903 ― 25 February 1930), priest and Martyr of China, canonized on 1 October 2000
- Artémides Zatti (12 October 1880 – 15 March 1951), professed religious and pharmacist, canonized on 9 October 2022

Blesseds

- August Czartoryski (2 August 1858 – 8 April 1893), Polish priest, beatified on 25 April 2004
- Michele Rua (9 June 1837 – 6 April 1910), Second Rector Major of the Salesians, beatified on 29 October 1972
- Bronisław Markiewicz (13 July 1842 – 29 January 1912), priest of the order and founder of the Congregation of Saint Michael the Archangel, beatified on 19 June 2005.
- Luigi Variara (15 January 1875 - 1 February 1923), priest and founder of the Daughters of the Sacred Hearts of Jesus and Mary, beatified on 14 April 2002
- Filippo Rinaldi (28 May 1856 – 5 December 1931), Third Rector Major of the Salesians, beatified on 29 April 1990
- Enrique Sáiz Aparicio and 59 Companions (died between July 1936 to March 1937), Martyrs of the Spanish Civil War, beatified on 28 October 2007
- Jan Świerc and 8 Companions (died between June 1941 to September 1942), Martyrs under the Nazi Occupation of Poland, declared Servants of God on 18 February 2003, beatified on 24 October 2025
- José Calasanz Marqués and 29 Companions (died between July 1936 to April 1938), Martyrs of the Spanish Civil War, beatified on 11 March 2001
- Józef Kowalski (13 March 1911 – 4 July 1942), Martyr of the Nazi Occupation of Poland, beatified on 13 June 1999
- Elia Comini (7 May 1910 – 1 October 1944), priest and martyr, promulgation on decree on martyrdom on 18 December 2024 and is currently awaiting beatification
- István Sándor (26 October 1914 – 8 June 1953), Hungarian laborer and martyred under communist rule, beatified on 19 October 2013
- Titus Zeman (4 January 1915 – 8 January 1969), Slovak priest martyred under communist rule, beatified on 30 September 2017

Venerables

- Andrea Beltrami (24 June 1870 - 30 December 1897), priest, declared Venerable on 15 December 1966
- Luigi Maria Olivares (18 October 1873 - 19 May 1943), professed religious and Bishop of Sutri-Nepi, declared Venerable on 20 December 2004
- Simone Sruji (15 April 1876 - 27 November 1943), Israeli professed religious, declared Venerable on 2 April 1993
- August Hlond (5 July 1881 – 22 October 1948), cardinal and Primate of all Poland, declared Venerable on 19 May 2018
- Rudolf Komórek (11 October 1890 - 11 December 1949), priest, declared Venerable on 6 April 1995
- Ignác Stuchlý (14 December 1869 - 17 January 1953), Czech priest, declared Venerable on 21 December 2020
- Octavio Ortiz Arrieta (19 April 1879 - 1 March 1958), Bishop of Chachapoyas, declared Venerable on 27 February 2017
- Joseph-Auguste Arribat (17 December 1879 - 11 March 1963), French priest, declared Venerable on 8 July 2014
- Giuseppe Quadrio (28 November 1921 - 23 October 1963), priest, declared Venerable on 19 December 2009
- Vincenzo Cimatti (15 July 1871 - 6 October 1965), priest, declared Venerable on 21 December 1991
- Antônio de Almeida Lustosa (11 February 1886 - 14 August 1974), Archbishop of Fortaleza, declared Venerable on 22 June 2023
- Francesco Convertini (29 August 1898 - 11 February 1976), priest, declared Venerable on 20 January 2017
- José Vandor Puchner [Wech József] (29 October 1909 - 8 October 1979), Hungarian priest, declared Venerable on 20 January 2017

Servants of God

- Louis Mertens (22 July 1864 - 25 April 1920), French priest
- Bernard Štuhec (5 January 1920 - c. June 1945), cleric and martyr of Slovenia under communist rule, declared as Servant of God on 17 May 2018
- Costantino Vendrame (27 August 1893 - 30 January 1957), priest, declared as Servant of God on 16 September 2006
- Carlo Braga (23 May 1889 - 3 January 1971), Filipino priest, declared as Servant of God on 31 January 2013
- Giuseppe Cognata (14 October 1885 - 22 July 1972), Bishop of Bova and founder of the Salesian Oblate Sisters of the Sacred Heart
- Rudolf Lunkenbein (1 April 1939 - 16 July 1976), German priest martyred in Brazil, declared as Servant of God on 7 September 2017
- Antoni Baraniak (1 January 1904 - 13 August 1977), Archbishop of Poznań
- Carlo della Torre (7 July 1900 - 4 April 1982), founder of the Secular Institute of the Daughters of the Queenship of Mary, and cofounder of the Sisters Servants of the Immaculate Heart of Mary, declared as Servant of God on 14 July 2003
- Antônio Campelo de Aragão (5 December 1904 - 10 September 1988), Bishop of Petrolina, founder of the Sisters Messengers of Mary and Sisters Mediators of Peace, declared as Servant of God on 16 May 2023
- Oreste Marengo (29 August 1906 - 30 July 1998), Bishop and Apostolic Administrator of Tura, declared as Servant of God on 9 July 2007
- Andrej Majcen (30 September 1904 - 30 September 1999), Slovenian priest, declared as Servant of God on 6 November 2008
- Silvio Galli (10 September 1927 - 12 June 2012), priest, declared as Servant of God on 19 February 2020
- Luigi Bolla (11 August 1932 - 6 February 2013), priest, declared as Servant of God on 16 December 2020
- Gaetano Nicosia (3 April 1915 - 6 November 2017), priest, declared as Servant of God on 16 July 2025

== Other notable members ==
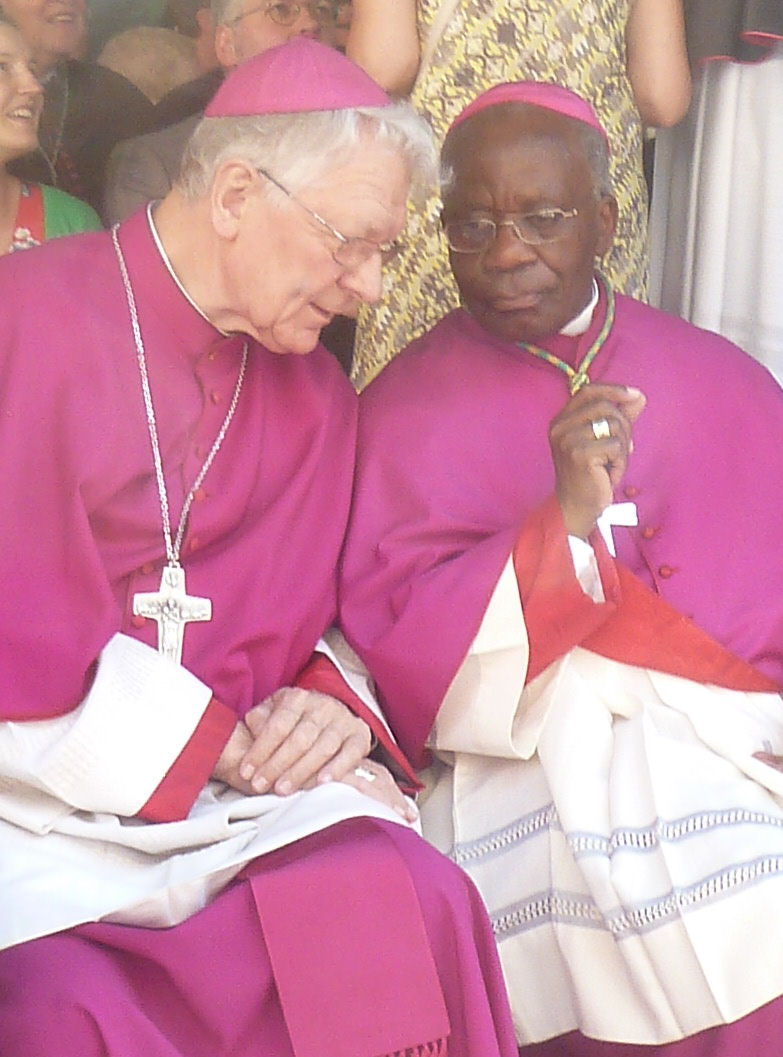
Lucas Van Looy (left), a Salesian and Bishop Emeritus of Ghent. He is alongside Augustine Kasujja, Apostolic Nuncio emeritus to Belgium and Luxembourg and Titular Archbishop of Caesarea in Numidia.

- Alfons Maria Stickler, cardinal
- Angelo Amato, cardinal
- Antonio María Javierre Ortas, cardinal
- Carlos Filipe Ximenes Belo, bishop
- Giovanni Cagliero, cardinal
- Ignacio Velasco, cardinal
- Javier de Nicoló, priest
- Jean-Bertrand Aristide, priest
- John Lee Tae-seok, priest
- Joseph Zen Ze-kiun, cardinal
- Julio César Grassi, priest
- Lucas Van Looy, bishop
- Vincenzo Savio, bishop
- Stefan Oster, bishop
- George Rajendran Kuttinadar, bishop
- Massimo Palombella, priest
- Miguel Obando y Bravo, cardinal
- Óscar Andrés Rodríguez Maradiaga, cardinal
- Raúl Silva Henríquez, cardinal
- Raffaele Farina, cardinal
- Rosalio José Castillo Lara, cardinal
- Stefan Czmil, bishop
- Štěpán Trochta, cardinal
- Tarcisio Bertone, cardinal
- Timothy Costelloe, bishop
- Broderick Pabillo, bishop
- Leo Drona, bishop

== See also ==
- Don Bosco School
- List of Salesian schools
- Rector Major of the Salesians
- Croatian Salesian Province of Saint Don Bosco
- Salesian Pastoral Youth Service, a Maltese Salesian developmental team of religious and lay youth leaders
- Salesians in Hungary
- Salesians in the Philippines
- Sexual abuse scandal in the Salesian order
- Bartolome Blanco Marquez, martyr of the religious persecutions of the Spanish Civil War
- Giuseppe Moja
- Jan Tyranowski, mentor of the young Karol Wojtyla, later to be Pope John Paul II
