= Primo =

Primo may refer to:

== Arts, entertainment and media ==
- Primo, sitting on the right side of the secondo in music for piano four hands
- Primo!, an Australian band
- Primo (film), a 2005 film recording of Antony Sher's play Primo
- Primo, or barriles, a type of Caribbean drums of Puerto Rico
- Primo (album), by Rifle Sport, 1991
- Primo, a 1991 album by Dr. Feelgood
- Primo (Yu-Gi-Oh! 5D's), a fictional character in Yu-Gi-Oh! 5D's
- Primo (TV series), a 2023 American comedy

== Business and brands ==
- Primo Brewing & Malting Company, based in Honolulu, Hawaii
- Primo Filmes, a Brazilian film production company
- Primo Foods, an Australian company
- Primo (milk), New Zealand flavoured milk brand
- Primo Water, an American-Canadian water company
- Primo, a brand of lenses by Panavision

== People ==
=== Given name ===
- Primo (footballer) (born 1989), São Toméan football goalkeeper
- Primo Brown (1976–2016), Italian rapper
- Primo Carnera (1906–1967), Italian boxer, World Heavyweight champion 1933–1934
- Primo Capraro (1873–1933), Argentine-Italian businessman
- Primo Cassarino (born 1956), enforcer for the Gambino crime family
- Primo Colón (born 1982), ring name of wrestler Eddie Colón
- Primo Conti (1900–1988), Italian Futurist artist
- Primo Levi (1919–1987), Italian chemist, Holocaust survivor, and author
- Primo Miller (1915–1999), American football player
- Primo Riccitelli (1880–1941), Italian composer
- Primo Zamparini (born 1939), Italian boxer
- Primus and Felician (Primo e Feliciano), Italian saints

=== Surname ===
- Al Primo (1938–2022), American TV news executive
- Catalina Primo (born 2000), Argentine footballer
- Francisco Primo de Verdad y Ramos (1760—1808), Novohispanic lawyer
- Gefen Primo (born 2000), Israeli judoka
- Giancarlo Primo (1924–2005), Italian basketball player
- Joshua Primo (born 2002), Canadian basketball player
- Kerem Primo (born 2005), Israeli judoka

== Other uses ==
- Primo TV, an American English-language television channel for Latino children
- Primo, the first course in Italian meal structure
- Duplo Primo and Lego Primo, now known as Lego Baby, Lego blocks for small children
- Plaxton Primo, a type of small bus produced by Plaxton

== See also ==
- Primos (disambiguation)
- Primo de Rivera, a surname
- Primo amore (disambiguation)
- DJ Premier, also known as Preemo, an American DJ and record producer
- Casorate Primo, a municipality in the Province of Pavia in Lombardy
- Castano Primo, a municipality in the Province of Milan in Lombardy
- Masciago Primo, a municipality in the Province of Varese in Lombardy
- Palasport Primo Carnera, an indoor sporting arena in Udine
- Primobolan, a brand name for metenolone
