= Casa Hacienda de Mandaloya =

- Former names: Asilo de Mandaloya, San Carlos Seminary
- Alternative names: Old Building

General information
- Type: institutional
- Architectural style: Bahay na bato
- Location: 736 General Kalentong Street, Mandaluyong City, Philippines
- Coordinates: 14°35′26″N 121°01′33″E
- Completed: February 1, 1716
- Owner: Archdiocese of Manila
- Affiliation: Salesians of Don Bosco

Technical details
- Floor count: 2

The Casa hacienda de Mandaloya (lit. 'Hacienda house of Madaloya') or Casa hacienda de Mandaloyon (lit. 'Hacienda house of Mandaloyon') is a historical and heritage building built on February 1, 1716, and the oldest casa hacienda in existence in the Philippines. It is located within the campus Don Bosco Technical College in Mandaluyong, Metro Manila.

Throughout its history, the building served as a convent, orphan asylum, provincial capitol, archdiocesan seminary and school. It was where the existence and secrets of the Katipunan was revealed in 1896, leading to its discovery by Spanish authorities that launched the Philippine revolution.

== Architecture ==
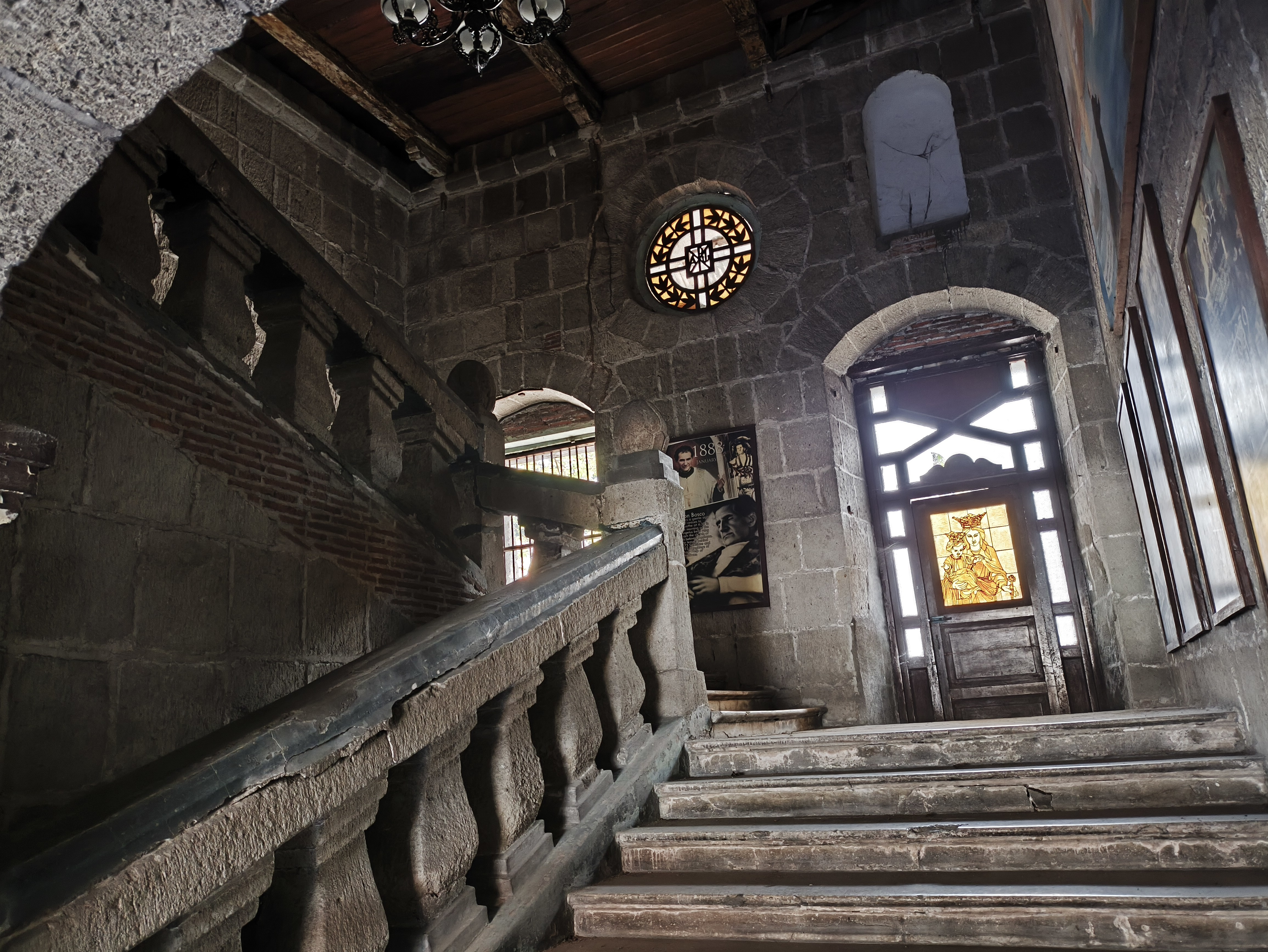
Grand staircase

The building possesses elements of the bahay na bato architecture, and was constructed in the style of a traditional mission complex with a wide inner courtyard. Its main (grand) staircase, and ground and second floors corridor have been preserved in its original structure.

== History ==
=== Augustinian convent ===
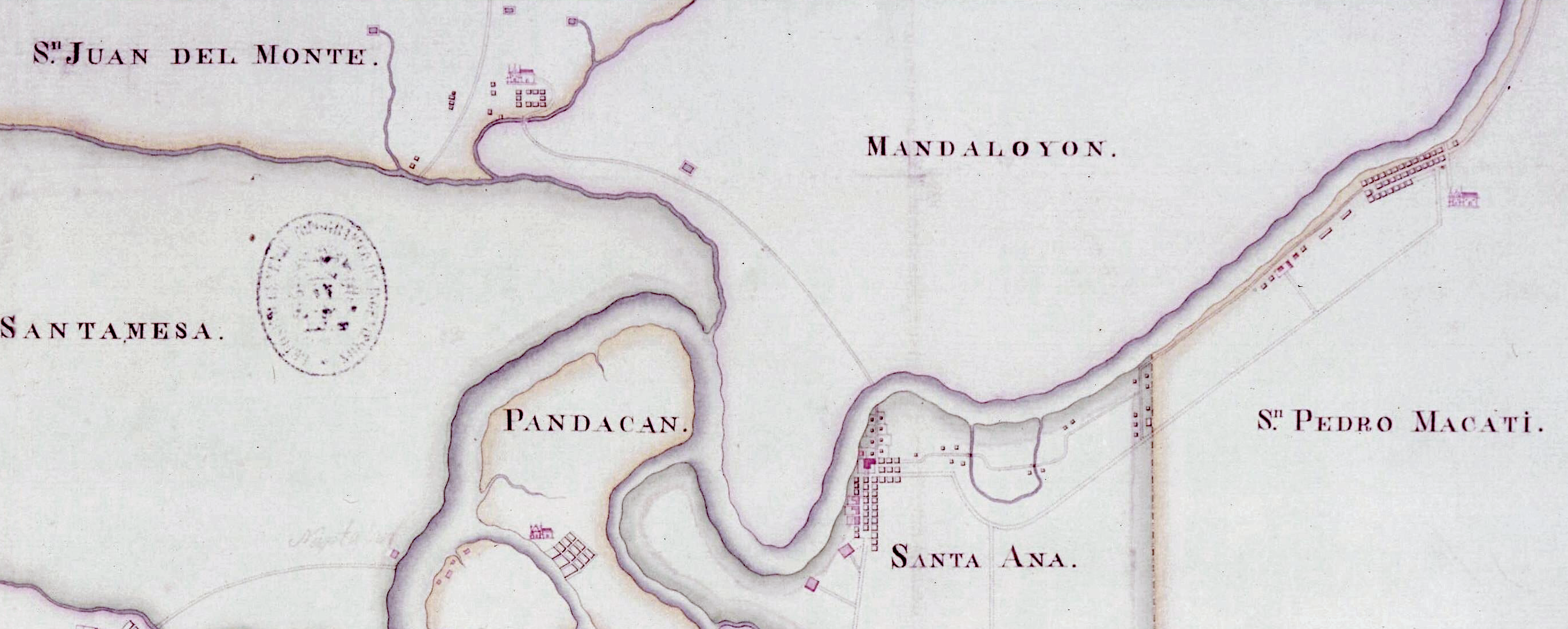
1814 map of Manila and its suburbs with the Casa hacienda de Mandaloya visible.

The Casa hacienda of Mandaloya started as a wooden house to lodge the caretaker of the Augustinian friars' more than 4,000 hectare landholding in the town of Santa Ana de Sapa, four kilometers east of the Spanish walled city of Manila. In 1702, the wooden house was enlarged and replaced using the materials from the stone house of Doña Jeronima Venegas, from whom the Augustinians bought land in 1675 that they would add to Hacienda de Mandaloya. Construction of the casa hacienda was completed in 1716 with a chapel dedicated to the Dulce Nombre de Jesus (lit. 'Sweet Name of Jesus').

The Private Definitory of the Augustinians in the Philippines convened at the casa hacienda in 1770 and 1773. In 1882, Fr. Celestino Fernández-Villar would complete and sign-off his contribution to the third edition of Fr. Manuel Blanco's Flora de Filipinas at the Casa-hacienda de Mandaloya.

The 1882–1883 cholera epidemic killed tens of thousands in Manila and the surrounding provinces, leaving numerous children orphaned and begging on the streets. In response to distressing conditions of the children, the Confraternity of Nuestra Señora de la Consolación—a group of Spanish Catholic matrons at San Agustin Church—took in some orphans, but later sought the help of the government as the task had become overburdening for them. Governor-General Primo de Rivera turned to the religious orders which had the resources for such undertaking.

=== Asilo de Mandaloya ===
The Augustinians readily cooperated to assume the obligation of caring for the orphans of the cholera epidemic. They constructed a temporary orphan shelter at San Marcelino in Paco. Soon, orphaned boys were transferred to Guadalupe in San Pedro Macati then to Tambobong, while orphaned girls were transferred to their converted convent in their Mandaloya hacienda. The casa hacienda would be known as the Asilo de Nuestra Señora de la Consolación de Mandaloya (lit. 'Asylum of Our Lady of Consolation of Mandaloya') or Asilo de Mandaloya.

To care for the orphaned girls, Fr. Salvador Font, Vicar Provincial of the Augustinians in Manila, and Fr. Jose Tintorer, Major Superior of the Augustinians in Spain invited the nuns of the Beaterio de Mantelatas de San Agustin of Barcelona, Spain. The first batch of nuns arrived on April 6, 1883 which included Sister Consuelo Barcelo, who would found the Congregación de las Hermanas Agustinas Terciarias de Filipinas (lit. 'Congregation of the Augustinian Tertiary Sisters of the Philippines').

More than the care of the orphaned girls, the nuns provided them with Christian education and were also taught music, piano, painting, drawing, dressmaking, hairdressing, lacemaking, laundry work, while their embroidery, sewing, and artificial flower-making won for them awards at the Madrid and Manila Expositions. Soon the asilo became an asilo-colegio (lit. 'asylum-college'). Education received by the orphaned girls at the asilo-colegio became widely known that nuns eventually acceded to the repeated requests of wealthy families to accept the daughters of peninsulares and mestizos as boarders. In 1893, during the priorship of Fr. Benito Ubierna, the casa hacienda was enlarged again to accommodate the growing number of boarders.

=== Discovery of the Katipunan ===
It was in the confines of the casa hacienda where the existence of the secret society of the Katipunan was revealed. On August 19, 1896, Teodoro Patiño, a disgruntled member of the Katipunan, divulged to his sister Honoria, an agraciada at the asylum-college, about the secret society and its plans to launch a revolution to overthrow Spanish rule. Shocked by the revelation and fearing for their lives, Honoria relayed the matter to her prioress, Sor Teresa de Jesús, who in turn convinced Teodoro to disclose everything he knew about the Katipunan to Fr. Mariano Gil, the Augustinian parish priest of Tondo, which Teodoro did later that day. An immediate crackdown of the Katipunan ensued that same evening, producing irrefutable evidence of the Katipunan's existence. The events of that day which began at the Casa Hacienda would compel Andres Bonifacio to advance his plans for the revolution and declare an open revolt a few days later.

=== Philippine Revolution to U.S. Occupation ===
The revolutionaries drove the nuns and about 200 orphans out of the orphan asylum, who would later be accommodated Guadalupe Fr. ______ surrendered to the revolutionaries on June 9, 1898.

It was bombarded in 1898 during the during the revolution, the hacienda and orphanage were occupied by the revolutionaries.

The building was partially damaged by bombing from American warships at Manila Bay during the Spanish-American War. It would be occupied by Filipino revolutionaries on June 9, 1898, forcing the surrender of the last administrator of the casa hacienda Fr. ________, and cause the displacement of the Augustinians nuns and about one hundred twenty orphans who fled the orphan asylum.

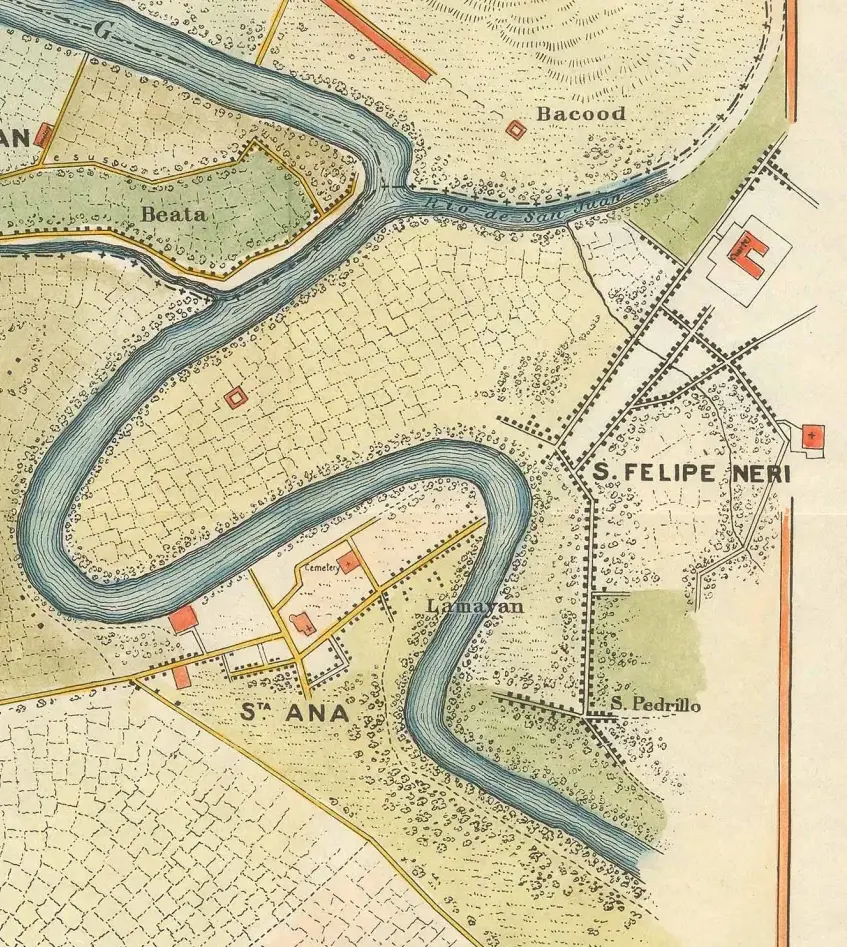
The Casa hacienda de Mandaloya at the upper-right corner labelled as a Cuartel (barracks) in 1901.

On February 5, 1899, the casa hacienda was captured by American troops from the Filipino Republican army a day after hostilities between them began in nearby Santa Mesa on February 4, 1899. The building served as barracks of American forces until December 22, 1902.

The Compañia Agrícola de Ultramar (lit. 'Overseas Agricultural Company'), a Spanish commercial company of the Augustinians would later claim rental payments against the United States government for occupying the casa hacienda for forty-five and a half months. Of the US$22,750 (1905) (equivalent to 815,208.33 in 2025) forwarded by the company as rental fee of the former orphan asylum, only 30 percent of the amount was viewed as “fair and ample” for its settlement. Ownership of Hacienda de Mandaloya with the casa hacienda, together with two other parcels of land was conveyed by the Augustinians to the company on February 7, 1893. An action similarly taken by the Dominicans and Recollects to transfer ownership of their estates to commercial companies to protect their holdings in anticipation of any outbreak of hostilities against Spanish rule.

=== Rizal capitol ===
Faced without its own government building since its creation in 1901, the provincial government of Rizal was forced by unfavorable financial conditions to move its capitol from the Gomez house it has been renting in Pasig to the casa hacienda where it functioned for seven months in 1904.

=== San Carlos Seminary ===
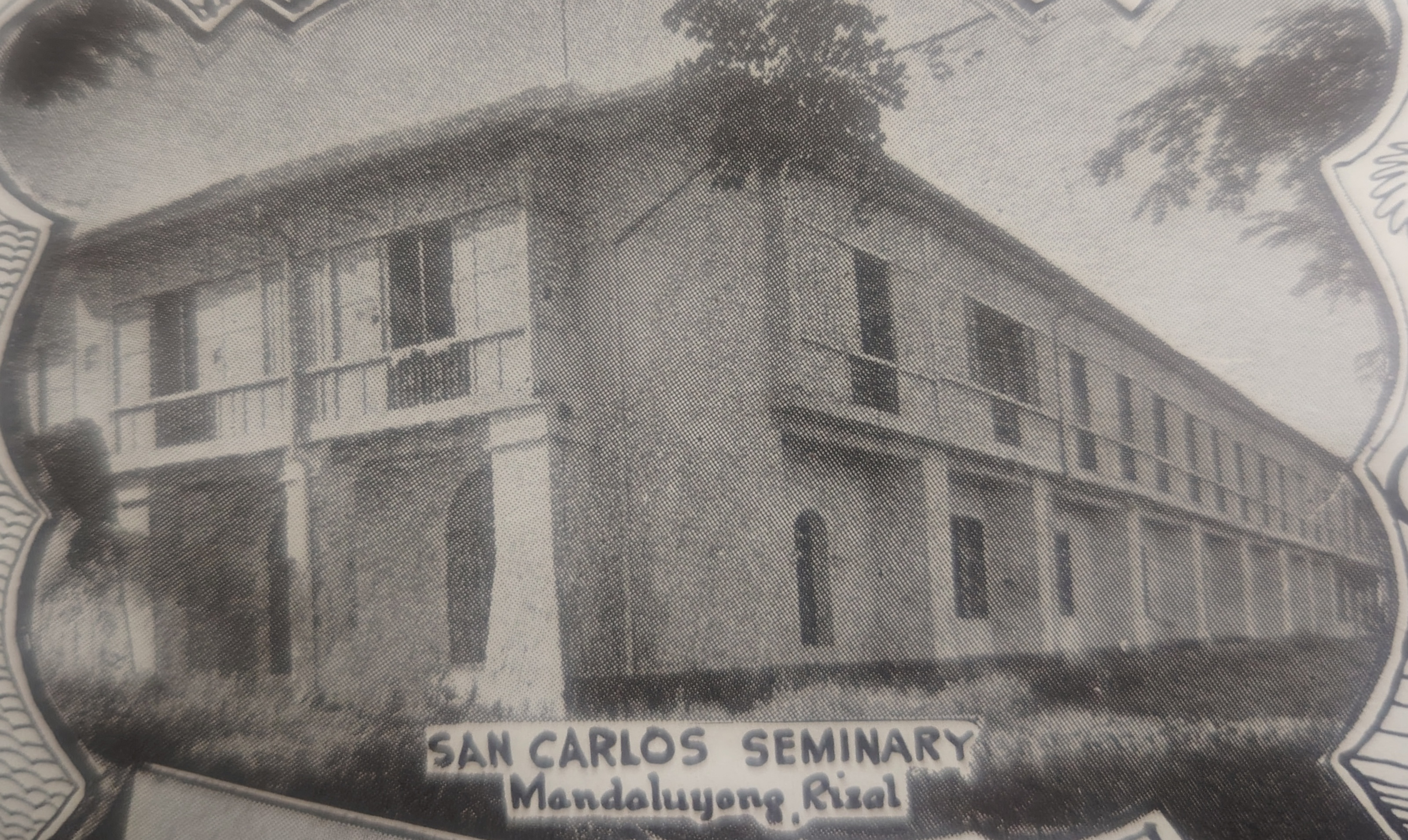
The Casa hacienda de Mandaloya in 1940. It housed San Carlos Seminary from 1913 to 1953.

In 1913, after the acquisition of the Archdiocese of Manila of the building and premises, Archbishop Jeremiah James Harty decided to use the renovated building of the former orphanage to reestablish San Carlos Seminary―under the administration of the Padres Paules or the Vincentians―after the Jesuit-run San Javier Seminary with which San Carlos was fused into two years earlier closed.

Until 1927, the building would house both major and minor seminarians. From that period, major seminarians transferred to the Vincentian Central House at San Marcelino Street in Manila, but would return again in 1936 up to 1937. Rufino Santos, the first Filipino cardinal were among the seminarians who had his formation when the seminary was in this building. In 1941, major and minor seminarians were once again reunited at the casa hacienda, but with the outbreak of World War II in the Philippines and impending Japanese invasion, the seminary was closed in December 1941.

=== World War II ===
On September 23, 1944, two days after the American aerial bombings to liberate the capital began, the Japanese forces commandeered the casa hacienda and confined the Vincentians and seminarians at the building's east wing. Even though the Vincentians were allowed by their Provincial, Fr. Jose Tejada to disperse to look for other shelter, others continued their pastoral work in various institutions including the Psychopathic Hospital, women's prison, juvenile delinquent facility and orphanages. On the other hand, Fathers Prisciano Gonzalez, Crispin Gomez, Antonino Mayoral, Brother Rafael Martinez heeded their Provincial's request for some to remain in the seminary building. A fourth year seminarian from Cavite, Gumersindo Novero decided to stay with them.

American aerial attacks intensified in the succeeding months. By December 4, Japanese Captain Tada ordered the priests to give up the entire building to the army. On Christmas Day, the Japanese assisted them in transferring their belongings to the abandoned house they had offered them in neighboring San Juan del Monte. All, except for Fr. Mayoral—who managed to escape—would be murdered on the evening of February 8, 1945, a day before the liberation of Mandaluyong from the Japanese.

With news of the arrival of American forces in Manila on February 3, the Japanese army abandoned the casa hacienda on February 4. This resulted in the building's looting by more than a thousand townspeople from the seminary's neighborhood. The seminary building was stripped of everything it had including its doors and windows. It would nevertheless survive the burning of residential homes in its vicinity as Japanese forces retreated.

For months, the casa hacienda was used as a sanctuary for American civilians who were rescued from the Santo Tomas Internment Camp in Sampaloc, Manila.

By August 1946, the Vincentian priests and seminarians were back at the building to resume their classes, after holding them for a year at the congregation's convent in Plaridel, Bulacan. Apostolic delegate to the Philippines Egidio Vagnozzi visited the seminary in January 1950. On January 24, 1953, the new seminary building envisioned by the first Filipino Archbishop of Manila Gabriel Reyes was inaugurated in Guadalupe, Makati, which paved the way for San Carlos Seminary's transfer that year.

=== Don Bosco Mandaluyong ===
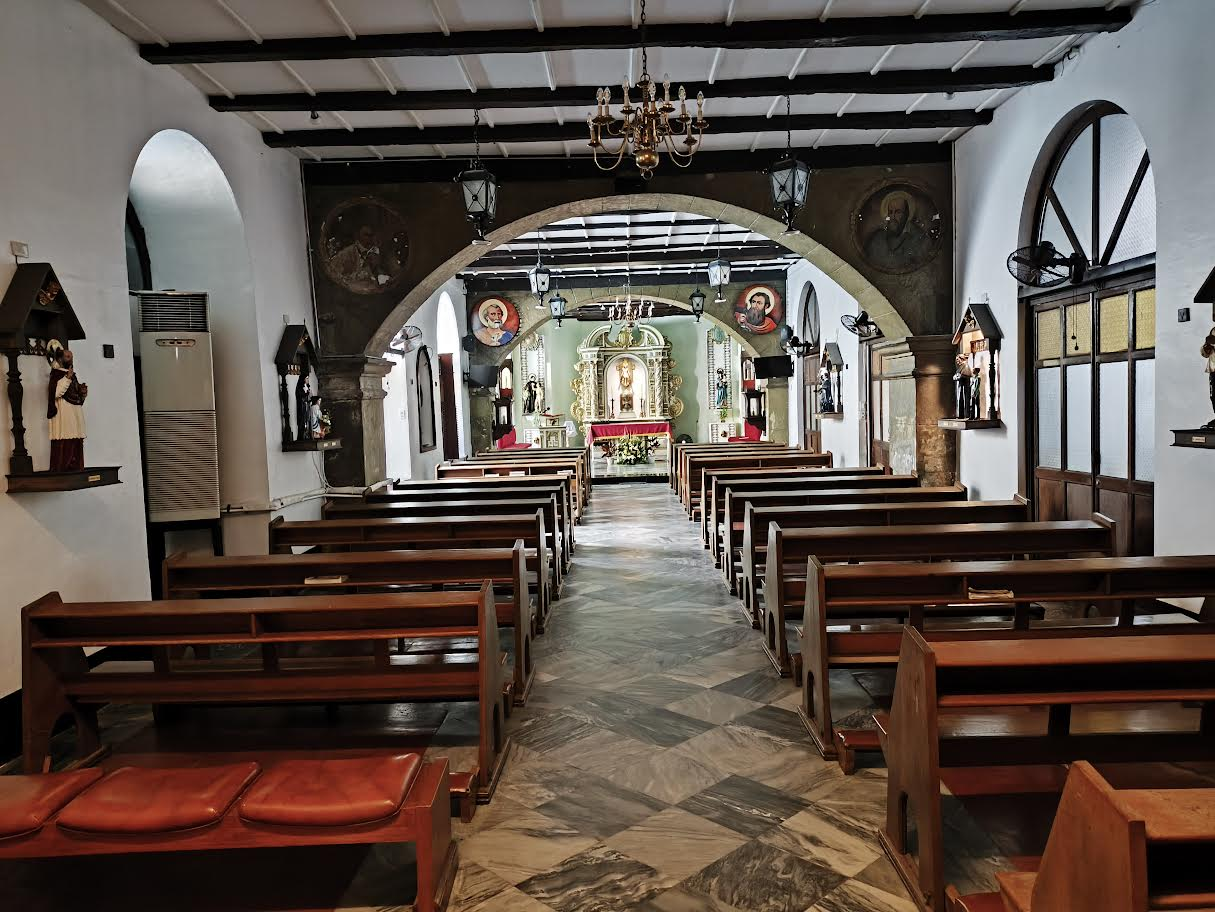
Mary Help of Christians Chapel

In 1953, as San Carlos Seminary was preparing to transfer to its permanent building and compound in Guadalupe, the Provincial Superior of the Salesians of Don Bosco's Sino–Filipino Province, Fr. Mario Acquistapace, accepted the offer of the Archbishop of Manila to take over the soon to be vacated seminary building to establish a school that will provide technical and vocational education. By June 2, 1953, the Salesians opened Don Bosco Technical Institute, Mandaluyong with 47 first year high school students, its third school in the Philippines—after establishing schools in Tarlac (1947) and Victorias (1951). By the next year, the Mandaluyong school was declared by Fr. Acquistapace as “the casa-madre (motherhouse) of the Salesian works in the Philippines.” The institute would soon grow around the casa hacienda with new buildings and facilities constructed around it as it expanded its educational offerings. It would become Don Bosco Technical College as it offered college degrees.

During the renovation of the chapel at the casa hacienda in 1977, a statue of Saint Joseph was discovered sealed within its walls. This would turn out to have been purposely hidden by the Augustinian nuns to protect it from the Filipino revolutionaries before they vacated the casa hacienda in 1898. It would find its way back in the custody of the Augustinian Sisters of Our Lady of Consolation at their convent in Pinaglabanan, San Juan on January 31, 2005, feast day of Saint John Bosco.

NHCP marker

With the Salesians of Dosco Bosco in-charge of the casa hacienda, it would be used as classrooms, faculty rooms, school offices, workshops, dormitories, recreational and dining halls. It presently houses the Rector–President's Office, Don Miguel Solaroli Library, and its chapel dedicated to Mary Help of Christians, the principal patroness of the Salesians.

On September 28, 2026, the National Historical Commission of the Philippines unveiled the building's NHCP historical marker. Fr. Bernard Nolasco SDB, rector of the Don Bosco Technical College Mandaluyong, said that parts of the building will be reopened as a museum.

== Hacienda de Mandaloya ==
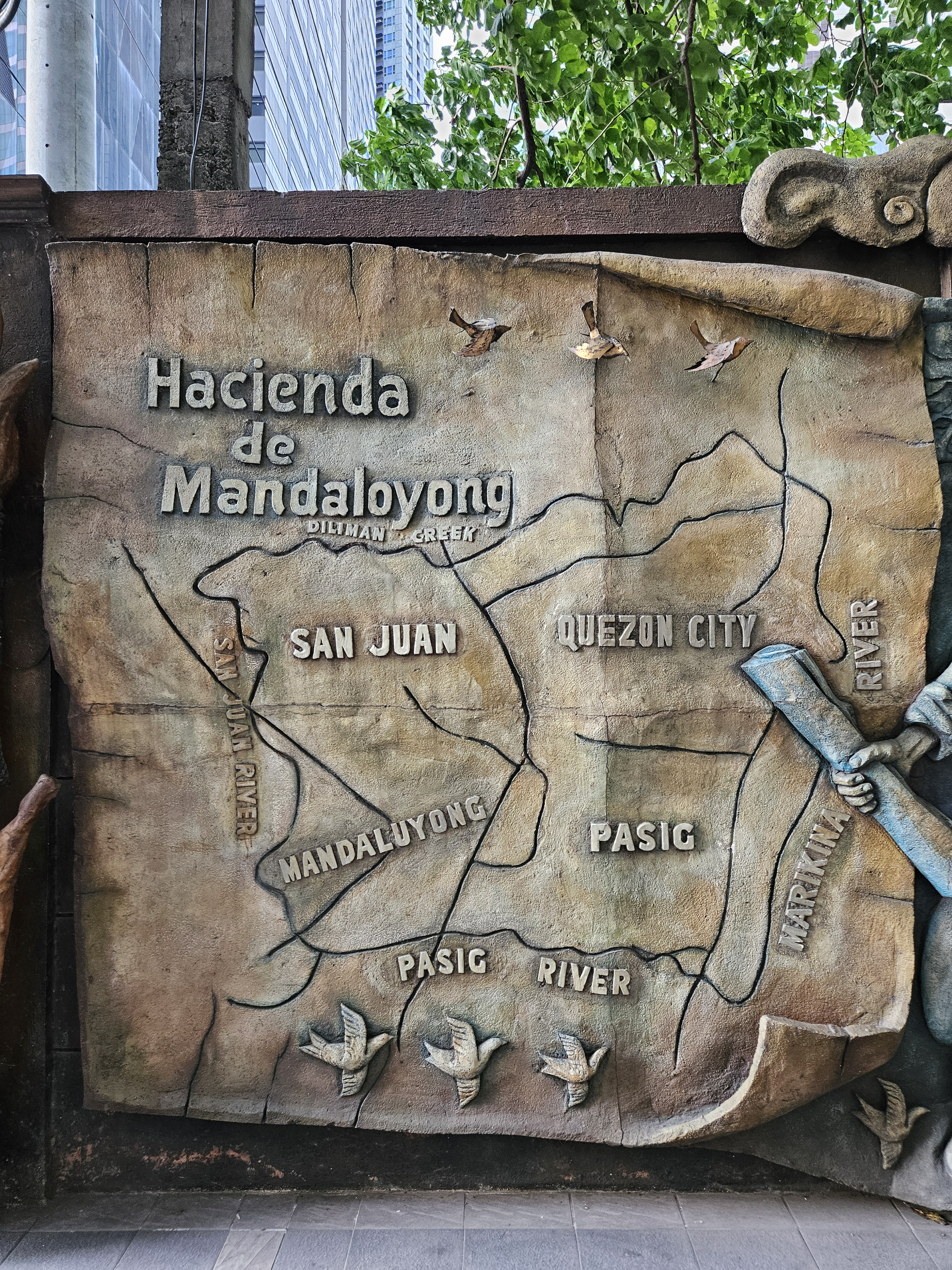
Map of the hacienda at Ortigas Park in Ortigas Center, Pasig.

The Hacienda de Mandaluyon (lit. 'Mandaluyong Estate'), also spelled Hacienda de Mandaloyon, Hacienda de Mandaloyong, or Hacienda de Mandaluyong, is a historical 4,033 ha (9,970-acre) hacienda of the Augustinian Order during the Spanish colonial period in the Philippines in present-day eastern Metro Manila, encompassing parts of the cities of Mandaluyong, Pasig, Quezon City, and San Juan.
