= Bonifacio Monument =

Monument in Caloocan, Philippines

- Bantayog ni Bonifacio
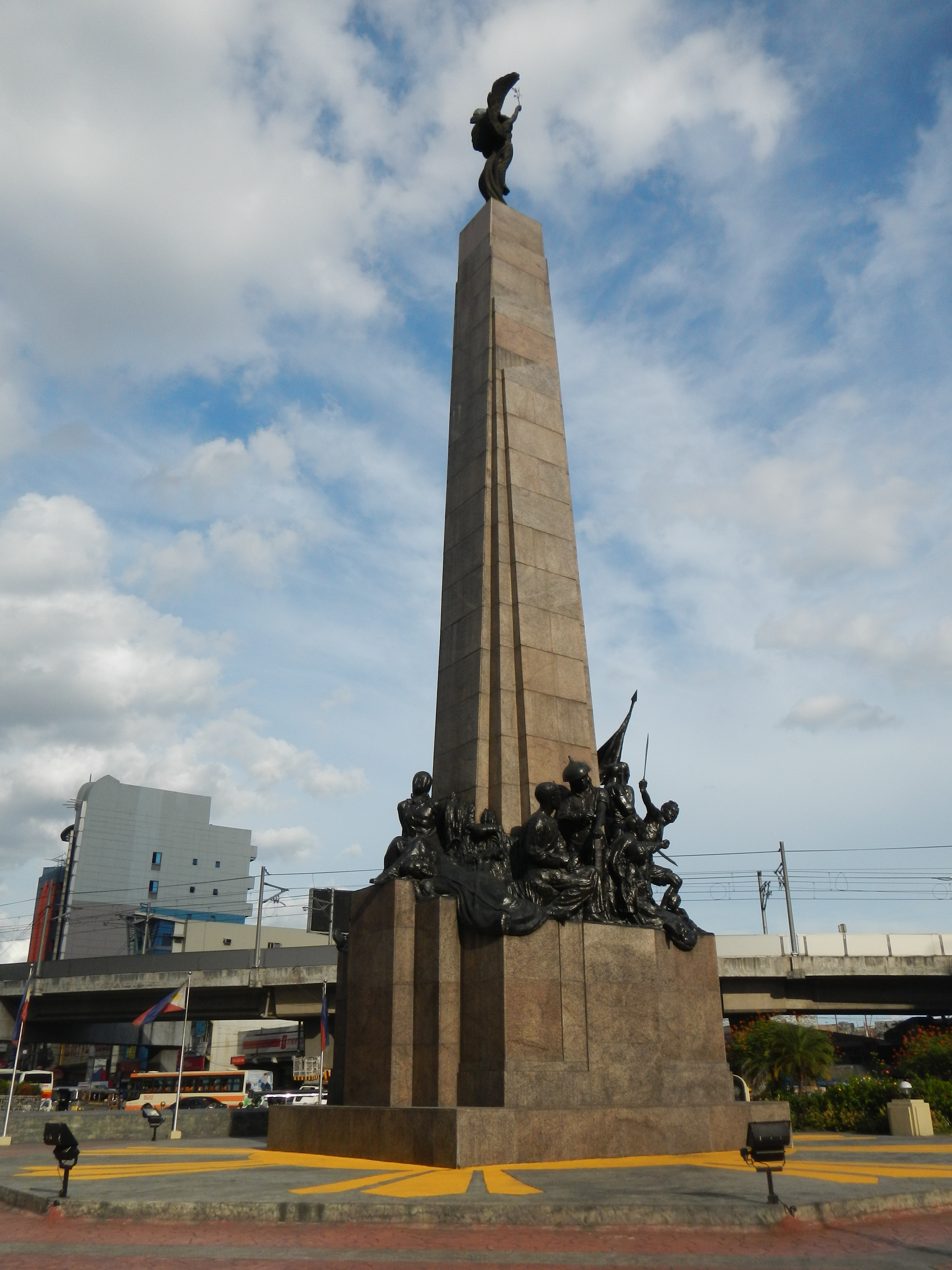
- Bonifacio Monument in 2013
- Interactive map of Bonifacio Monument
- Location: Caloocan, Metro Manila, Philippines
- Coordinates: 14°39′25″N 120°59′02″E
- Designer: Guillermo Tolentino
- Height: 13.7 m (45 ft)
- Beginning date: November 30, 1929
- Opening date: November 30, 1933
- Dedicated to: The memory of Andrés Bonifacio, Supremo of the Katipunan

National Cultural Treasures
- Official name: Bonifacio National Monument
- Designated: November 30, 2009; 16 years ago
- Region: National Capital Region

National Historical Landmarks
- Official name: Bonifacio National Monument
- Type: Structure, Monument
- Designated: August 14, 2002; 24 years ago
- Region: National Capital Region
- Legal basis: Resolution No. 9, s. 2002
- Marker: 2009

The Andrés Bonifacio Monument, commonly known simply as Bonifacio Monument or Monumento, is a memorial monument in Caloocan, Philippines, which was designed by National Artist Guillermo Tolentino to commemorate the Philippine revolutionary Andrés Bonifacio, the founder and Supremo of the Katipunan, who fought for independence from colonial rule by Spain.

The monument, 13.7 meters (45 ft) in height, contains symbolic images and other features known as the "Cry of Balintawak". It is acclaimed as one of the best monuments in the world.

== Location ==
The monument is located in South Caloocan at a roundabout crossing of four roads, namely Epifanio de los Santos Avenue (EDSA), the MacArthur Highway, the Samson Road, and Rizal Avenue Extension (Avenida Rizal), the old road leading to Manila.

== History ==
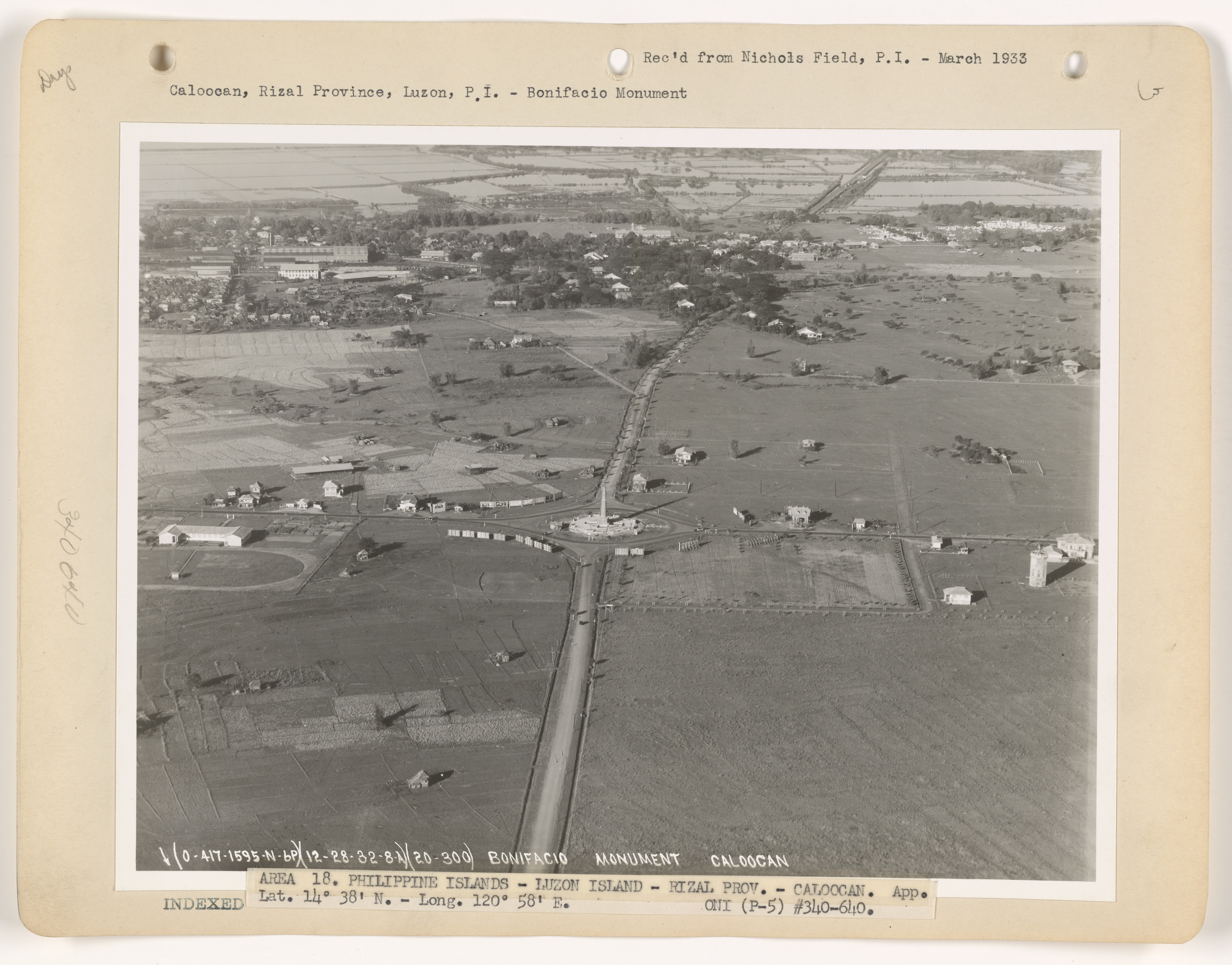
Aerial view of Bonifacio Monument at Caloocan, 1933

The Bonifacio Monument recalls the Philippine Revolution spearheaded by Andrés Bonifacio, who had urged his men to rise against the colonial rule of Spain. His call to take arms against the Spanish rule was given on August 23, 1896, widely known as the "Cry of Pugad Lawin".

The cornerstone was formally laid by Aurora Quezon, the wife of Filipino Senate President and future President Manuel L. Quezon, on November 30, 1929, Bonifacio's 66th birth anniversary. The monument, which was created under the orders of American Governor-General Frank Murphy, was inaugurated exactly four years later on November 30, 1933. The contract for its construction was reportedly worth ₱125,000 (equivalent to ₱38,986,072 in 2021). It was inaugurated by House Speaker Quintín Paredes, with much fanfare in a colourful function led by three women from Luzon (of the Women's College), Visayas (of the Institute of Women), and Mindanao (of the Centro Escolar de Señoritas/Center for Women) with other women representing the eight provinces of Manila, Cavite, Batangas, Bulacan, Pampanga, Tarlac, Nueva Ecija, and Laguna which had participated in the revolution of 1896.

On November 30, 2013, the sesquicentennial of Bonifacio's birth and the 80th anniversary of the monument's unveiling was celebrated.

== Features ==
The Bonifacio Monument, which was sculpted by Guillermo Tolentino in 1933, is an obelisk that rises to a height of 13.7 meters (45 ft); the obelisk is made up of five parts representing five aspects of the society, "Kataastaasan, Kagalanggalang na Katipunan ng mga Anak ng Bayan" (transl. Highest and Most Venerable Association of the Sons of the Nation). It is crowned by a figure with wings representing triumph. Below the vertical pylon, 20 figures cast in bronze have been molded over an octagonally shaped plinth, plus one angel of peace at the top. The octagon represents the eight provinces that fought against Spain and also the eight rays of the Katipunan flag. The plinth is raised in three steps, with each representing the three centuries of Spanish rule. These figures are a representation of the people of the Philippines, who faced inequality, agony and suppression under colonial rule, which eventually ended in an armed revolution in 1896. The main central image of the monument holds a bolo, a machete in the right hand, and a gun in the other hand. At the back of the central figure, a flag of Katipunan in an unfurled state is depicted. A remarkable feature of the molded images of the human figures is the classic style, with detailing marked by realistic expressions reflecting the revolutionary spirit with an "upright head and body" and arms spread on the sides. The central obelisk is surrounded by pools of water.

== Gallery ==
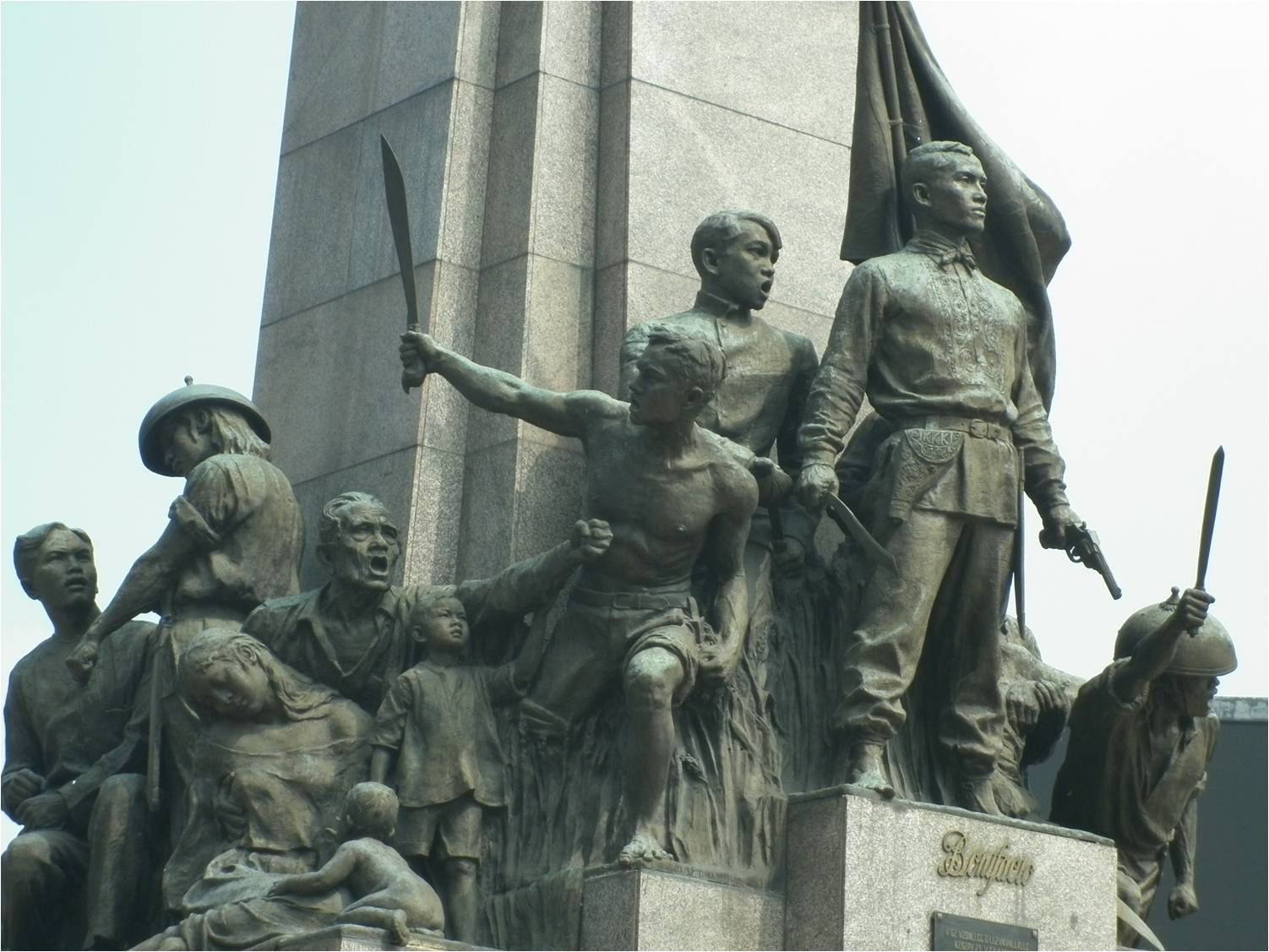
Bronze figures at the base

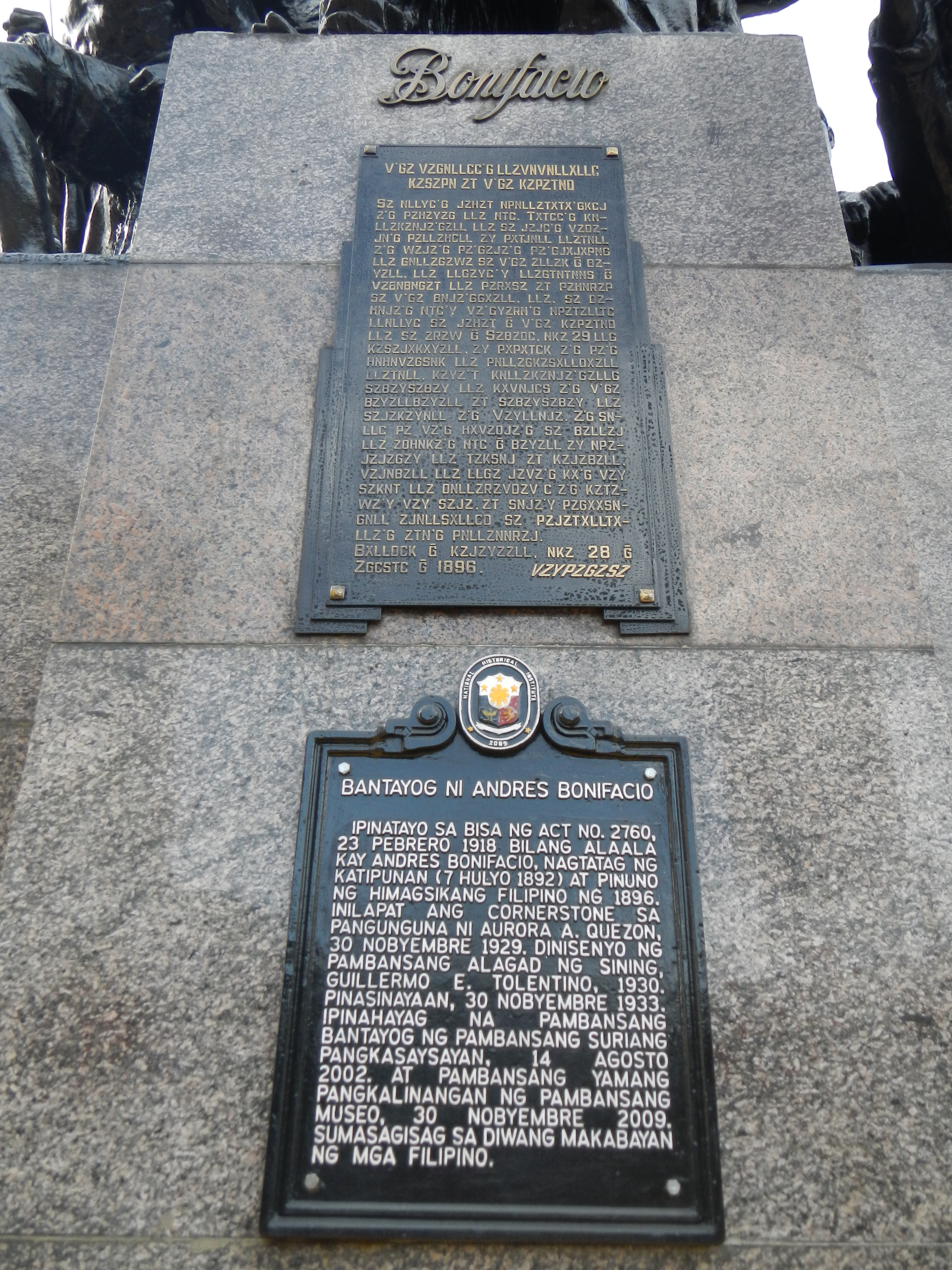
Commemorative plaques

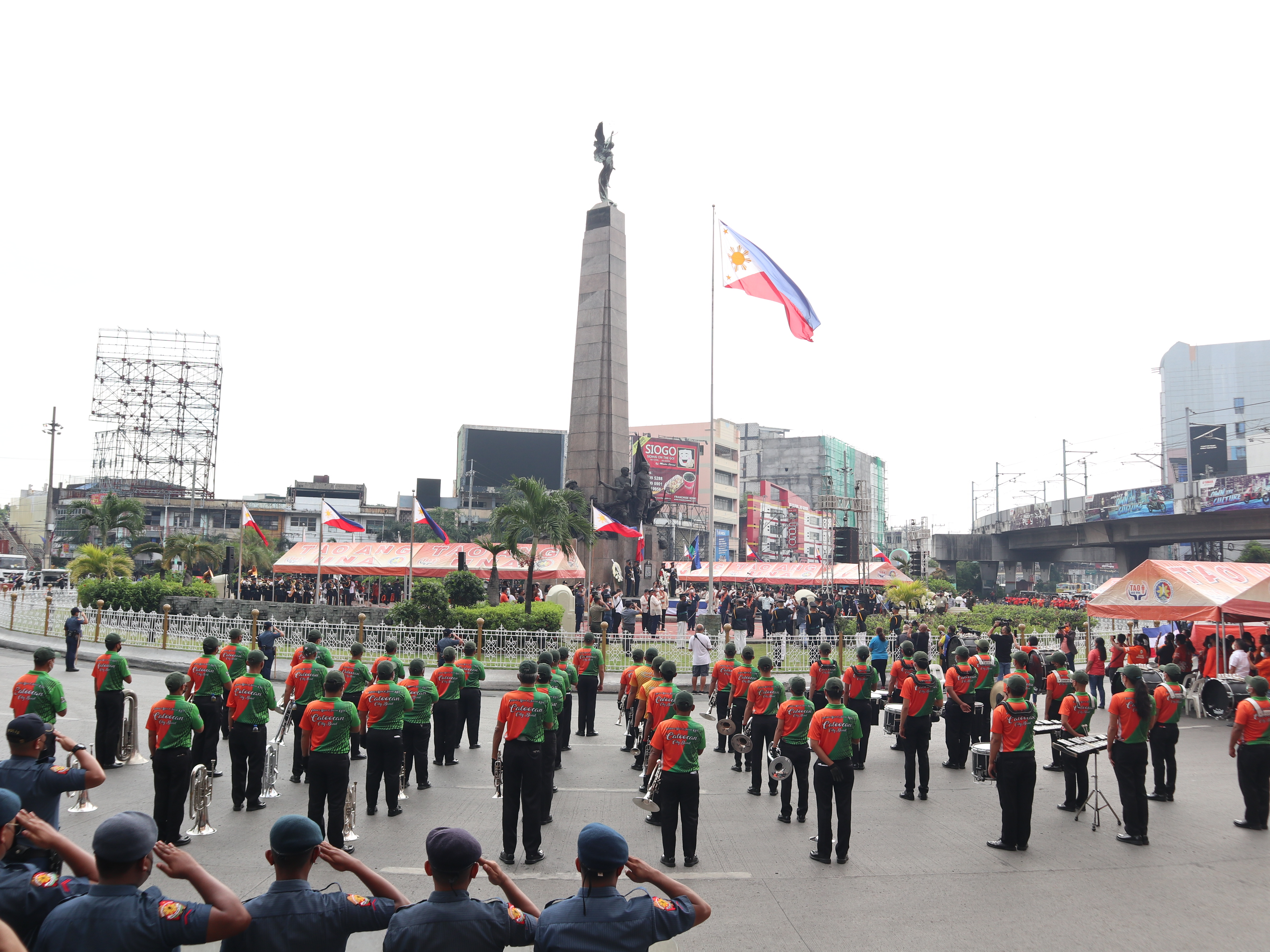
2022 Independence Day commemorations

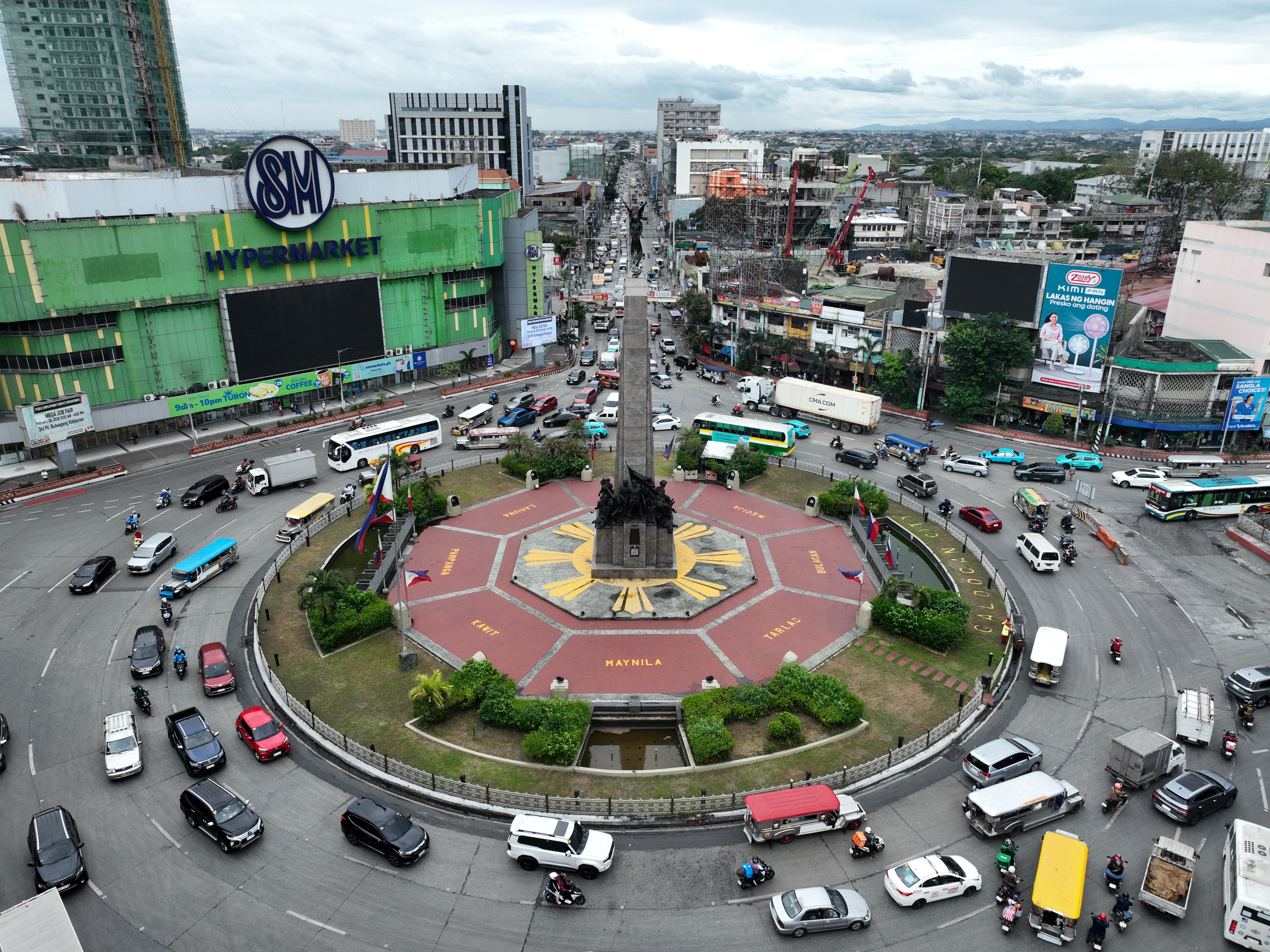
Drone shot of the monument at Monumento Circle

== See also ==
- Monument to the Heroes of 1896
