= Primos =

Primos may refer to:

- Primos (TV series), an American animated series
- Cousinhood (Spanish: Primos), a 2011 Spanish romantic comedy film
- Cousins (2019 film) (Portuguese: Primos), a Brazilian film
- PRIMOS, an operating system developed during the 1970s by Prime Computer
- Primos, Pennsylvania, a neighborhood in the Delaware Valley metropolitan area, United States
  - Primos station
- Primos (comics), 2022 science fiction comic book limited series

== See also ==
- Primo (disambiguation)
