= Don Bosco Technical College =

Roman Catholic college in Mandaluyong, Philippines

- Istituto Tecnico Don Bosco
- Take the higher step.
- Other names: DBTC, DB Manda and Don Bosco Mandaluyong
- Former name: Don Bosco Technical Institute-Mandaluyong (1953–1966)
- Motto: Ascende Superius (Latin)
- Motto in English: Come Up to a Higher Place
- Type: Private Catholic non-profit coeducational basic and higher education institution
- Established: June 2, 1953; 73 years ago
- Founder: Salesians of the Society of Saint John Bosco
- Accreditation: PAASCU, DepEd, CHED, ISO and UKAS
- Religious affiliation: Roman Catholic (Salesian)
- Academic affiliations: PAASCU, TESDA, UKAS, Moody International IUS the Moody International UKAS
- Rector: Fr. Bernard Nolasco, SDB
- Vice-Rector: Fr. Joey Paras SDB
- Faculty: Approx. 300
- Students: Approx. 6,000
- Location: 736 Gen. Kalentong St., Brgy. Pag-asa, Mandaluyong City, Metro Manila, 1550; 14°35′24″N 121°01′32″E
- Campus: Urban, 4 hectares (40,000 m^{2})
- Colors: Navy blue, white, gray
- Sporting affiliations: NCAA (Phil.) South; MILO Best Pasarelle; PRADA; CEAP; PAYA
- Mascot: Gray Wolf named Grigio
- Website: dbmanda.one-bosco.org
- Location in Metro Manila Location in Luzon Location in the Philippines

Don Bosco Technical College, also referred to by its acronym DBTC, Don Bosco Mandaluyong or informally DB Manda, is a private Catholic basic and higher education institution run by the Salesians of the Society of Saint John Bosco in Mandaluyong, Metro Manila, Philippines. Established in 1953 by the Salesians, it is the first Don Bosco Educational Center in Metro Manila. Don Bosco Mandaluyong offers co-educational (offers both male and female students) primary (elementary) and secondary education (junior high school), co-educational senior high school and college (tertiary education), night school (alternative learning system), and vocational training for out-of-school youth.

The college department was formerly exclusive to males until 2004, when the department started accepting female students. DBTC has been starting to accept female students since it piloted Senior High School. Following the nationwide implementation of K-12, DBTC implemented the co-educational senior high school program in 2016. The institution is fully co-educational across all grade levels and programs.

It is part of the IUS or the Istituzioni Universitarie Salesiane (Salesian University Institutions), the Don Bosco Educational Apostolate of the Philippines, and the Don Bosco Philippines North Province (DB-FIN). Don Bosco Mandaluyong was awarded the ISO 9001:2000 certification (Certificate No. 6720) by Moody International Certification (Malaysia) Sdn. Bhd. and United Kingdom Accreditation Service.

Don Bosco Mandaluyong was envisaged as one of the "Big Three" schools in Mandaluyong, together with La Salle Green Hills and Lourdes School of Mandaluyong, which also offer all-boys elementary and secondary education. However, of the three, only Lourdes School of Mandaluyong remained an all-boys school by AY2020-2021. DBTC is deemed the "Motherhouse of all Salesian works in the Philippines," making it the premier Salesian institution for higher learning in the country. Its campus is located at 736 General Kalentong Street in Mandaluyong, Metro Manila, Philippines.

== History ==
Rectors of Don Bosco Mandaluyong
Aloysius Ferrari (1953–1956)
Pierangelo Quaranta (1956–1964)
George Schwarz (1964–1967)
John Clifford (1967–1969)
William Balocco (1969–1971)
Agustin Lopez (1971–1977)
Francesco Panfilo (1977–1985)
Luciano Capelli (1985–1991)
Precioso Cantillas (1991–1992)
Rolo Alcasid (1992–1997)
Luisito Castañeda (1997–2002)
Eligio Cruz (2002–2008)
Martin Macasaet (2008–2014)
Vitaliano Dimaranan (2014–2020)
Ronilo Javines (2020–2025)
Jayson David (2025-2025)
Bernard Nolasco (2026-present)

=== 18th–19th centuries ===
Don Bosco Technical College stands on historic grounds. The 18th-century Spanish-era convent building (1716) at the heart of the campus is a testimony to events that led to the 1896 uprising of the country's patriots, the Katipuneros, against the Spanish colonizers.

The building later became the Asilo de Mandaloya, an orphanage where Mother Consuelo Barcelo y Pages stayed for 16 years (1883–1899). She co-founded the Augustinian Sisters of Our Lady of Consolation.

On August 19, 1896, within the confines of the Asilo, Katipunero Teodoro Patiño confessed to Augustinian parish priest of Tondo, Fray Mariano Gil, the existence of the Katipunan. This was after Patiño's sister and one of the Asilo employees, Honorata, passed on the information after his brother shared it to her. This admission sparked the outbreak of the Philippine Revolution.

=== 20th century ===
Early in the 20th century, the building became the San Carlos Seminary, home for the formation of the local clergy. One of them was Rufino Santos, the first Filipino cardinal of the Church. Don Bosco Mandaluyong opened as a school aptly named "Don Bosco Technical Institute–Mandaluyong" on 2 June 1953 with 47 first-year high school students.

=== Present day ===
NHCP marker

Since its foundation, Don Bosco Mandaluyong has grown into a complex setting that serves almost 4,000 students and 40,000 parishioners. Its services include the Basic Education Department, College Department, Industrial Technicians Course, Manpower Skills and Training Center, Center for Research and Training, Information Systems and Technology Center, Don Bosco Youth Center, St. Dominic Savio Parish, and Pinardi Boarding House.

== Seal ==
The logo used by Don Bosco Mandaluyong in 2007.

The seal is bordered on top by the school's motto: Ascende Superius, which means "come up to a higher place".

At the center of the seal is a cross, symbolizing the primacy of Catholic education and formation of the institution. The cross rests on a salakot – a traditional Filipino hat – to signify the distinct Filipino character.

Between the horizontal section of the cross and the salakot is the founding year of the school, 1953, appearing atop three lines. The lines represent the three elements of Don Bosco's Preventive System of Education, namely: Reason (principle-driven life), Religion (spirituality) and Loving Kindness (connectedness and mutuality). The lines which resemble waves, daluyong in the local language, recall the legendary origin of the community of Mandaluyong. Tradition has it that the name of the city where the school is located originated from the abundance of the waves or "mga daluyong".

The half-gear on the left and the laurel leaves on the right that surround the central design are emblematic respectively of technical and academic education. This seal in its current form was first used in 1988–89. The original seal consisted only of the blue-green half-gear and laurel leaves.

== Programs offered ==
=== Basic Education Sector ===
The Don Bosco Technical College-BED (Basic Education Department) consists of three programs, namely the Grade School, the Junior High School and the Senior High School.

Don Bosco Mandaluyong has a dual academic-technical curriculum since its foundation in 1953. Students take both standard academic courses prescribed by the Department of Education (Philippines). Technical studies are the equivalent of the standard Technology and Livelihood Education subject in other schools, with the subjects focusing more on future occupations connected to engineering and technology.

==== Grade School ====
The Don Bosco Technical College-Grade School is a Catholic elementary school for boys and girls, offering Kindergarten until Grade 6. The Grade School Program advocates Information Literacy as its approach to the basic curriculum required by the Department of Education. Its entire program is located in the Doña Cecilia Building and the Savio Quadrangle beside the High School Building.

The technical subjects are offered throughout the four years of Grade School, with computer technology taken during the four years and all technical subjects taken during fourth, fifth, and sixth grades.

Technical subjects:

- Computer Information Technology
- Work Education (includes Mechanical, Electronics, Electrical, and Drafting Technology) (For Grades 4 and above)
- Robotics

==== Junior high school ====
High school boys bonding with their "bunso" brothers from the Grade School

The Don Bosco Technical College-Junior High School is a Catholic secondary school for boys and girls, with a population of approximately 1,000 students. Its entire program is located in the High School Building (formerly the Blessed Philip Rinaldi Building) and the Savio Quadrangle beside the Dona Cecilia Building.

The technical subjects are offered throughout the four years of Junior High School, with general technology subjects taken during seventh and eighth grades and a chosen specialization in the ninth and tenth grades (based on previous grades and a written placement exam).

Technical specializations & subjects:

- Computer Technology
- Mechanical Technology
- Electronics Technology
- Industrial Electricity
- Drafting Technology (only seventh and eighth grades)
- Computer-aided Design (only ninth and tenth grades)

==== Senior High School ====
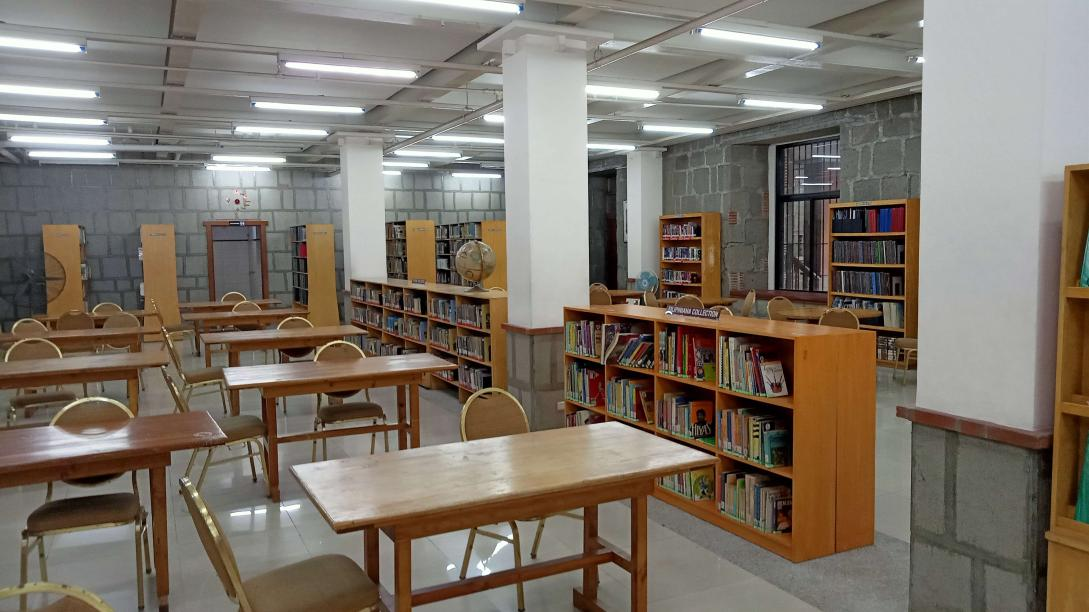
Inside of the Don Miguel Solaroli Library a.k.a. the Grade School Library

Tracks offered:

- STEM (Science, Technology, Engineering, and Math)
- ABM (Accountancy, Business, and Management)
- DMT (Digital Media Technology)

=== College Sector ===
Programs offered:

- Bachelor of Science in Architecture
- Bachelor of Science in Mechanical Engineering
- Bachelor of Science in Information Technology

=== TVET Sector ===
The TVET (Technical Vocational Education and Training Center; formerly the Manpower Skills and Training Center) was established in 1971 primarily to assist the youth of various communities by offering technical training as a means of acquiring manpower skills.

Fields offered:

- Domestic Refrigeration and Air-conditioning (DOMRAC) NCII
- Machining NCII
- Electrical Installation Maintenance (EIM) NCII
- Mechatronics Servicing NCII

=== Aircraft Maintenance Technology ===
Aircraft Maintenance Technology is a 2-year technician program within the DBTC campus, plus a 3-month Supervised In-Plant Training (SIPT) in reputable companies and industrial workplaces. Students are taught to have mastery over reciprocating machines and familiarity in jet engine operations. This program enables to become specialized technicians in both Airframe and Powerplant, and are qualified to continue towards a bachelor's degree in Aeronautical Engineering and in related fields.

== Affiliations and accreditations ==
Don Bosco Mandaluyong is a member school of the National Collegiate Athletic Association (Philippines) South, which consists of schools from the Calabarzon Region (south of Metro Manila) and most central and southern parts of the National Capital Region. Distinguished from the NCAA Philippines-Main, NCAA-South's founding members were mostly sister schools of the NCAA-Main member schools. Don Bosco Technical College played host to the 2007–2008 ninth NCAA Philippines-South season. National academic, non-athletic affiliations and accreditations include the Philippine Accrediting Association of Schools, Colleges and Universities (PAASCU), Commission on Higher Education (Philippines) (CHED), the Don Bosco-FIN Office for the Development of the Educational Apostolate, and the Department of Education (Philippines) (DepEd).

International affiliations are the Istituzioni Universitarie Salesiane (IUS), corresponding to the international recognition of being a Salesian institution, the Moody International Certification (International Organization for Standardization), and the United Kingdom Accreditation Service (UKAS).

== Notable alumni ==
- Benjamin Abalos, Jr. - former mayor of Mandaluyong, former MMDA chairman, Campaign Manager of Ferdinand "Bongbong" Marcos, Jr. and Secretary of Department of Interior and Local Government
- Joem Bascon – Filipino actor under ABS-CBN's talent management arm, Star Magic.
- Jose Isidro Camacho – Banker and former secretary of the Departments of Finance and Energy
- Ricky Davao – Filipino actor, television director and industrial management engineer
- Vince Dizon – Filipino economist, consultant and political dide, former president and CEO of the Bases Conversion and Development Authority., served under as President Rodrigo Duterte's Adviser on Flagship Programs and Projects and as Deputy Chief Implementer of the National Action Plan Against *COVID-19.
- Rod Espinosa – Filipino comics creator, writer, and illustrator.
- Gregorio Honasan – former senator of the Republic of the Philippines and AFP officer
- Ranz Kyle – Filipino actor, dancer, singer, and social media personality.
- Francis Magalona – Filipino rapper, singer and songwriter, widely regarded as "The Filipino King of Rap" and often credited as the Pioneer of Pinoy Hip-Hop
- Manuel L. Quezon III – Writer and television host
- Vice Admiral Caesar Bernard N. Valencia PN - The 85th Superintendent of the Philippine Military Academy. https://www.gmanetwork.com/news/topstories/nation/914107/caesar-valencia-takes-over-as-new-pma-superintendent/story/ https://www.afp.mil.ph/news/afp-welcomes-new-pma-superintendent-honors-outgoing-general
