= Primo (footballer) =

São Toméan footballer

Personal information
- Full name: Aldair Cravid D´Almeida
- Date of birth: 9 September 1989 (age 37)
- Position: Goalkeeper

Team information
- Current team: Praia Cruz

Senior career*
Years	Team	Apps	(Gls)
- Praia Cruz

International career^{‡}
2017–	São Tomé and Príncipe	8	(0)
- * Club domestic league appearances and goals ‡ National team caps and goals as of 13 November 2020

Aldair Cravid D´Almeida (born 9 September 1989), commonly known as Primo, is a São Toméan footballer who plays as a goalkeeper for Sporting Praia Cruz, and the São Tomé and Príncipe national team.

== International career ==
Primo made his international debut for São Tomé and Príncipe in 2017.
