= Primo amore =

Primo amore may refer to:

- Primo amore (1941 film), a 1941 film directed by Carmine Gallone
- Primo amore (1959 film), a 1959 film directed by Mario Camerini
- Primo amore (1978 film), a 1978 film directed by Dino Risi
- Primo amore (2004 film), a 2004 film directed by Matteo Garrone
