= Primo de Rivera =

Primo de Rivera is a Spanish family prominent in politics of the 19th and 20th centuries:

- Fernando Primo de Rivera (1831–1921), Spanish politician and soldier
- Miguel Primo de Rivera (1870–1930), nephew of Fernando, military officer and dictator in Spain from 1923 to 1930
- José Antonio Primo de Rivera (1903–1936), son of Miguel, lawyer who founded the Falange Española
- Pilar Primo de Rivera (1907–1991), daughter of Miguel, founded the women's section of the Falange
