= Southwoods Mall =

Shopping mall in the Philippines

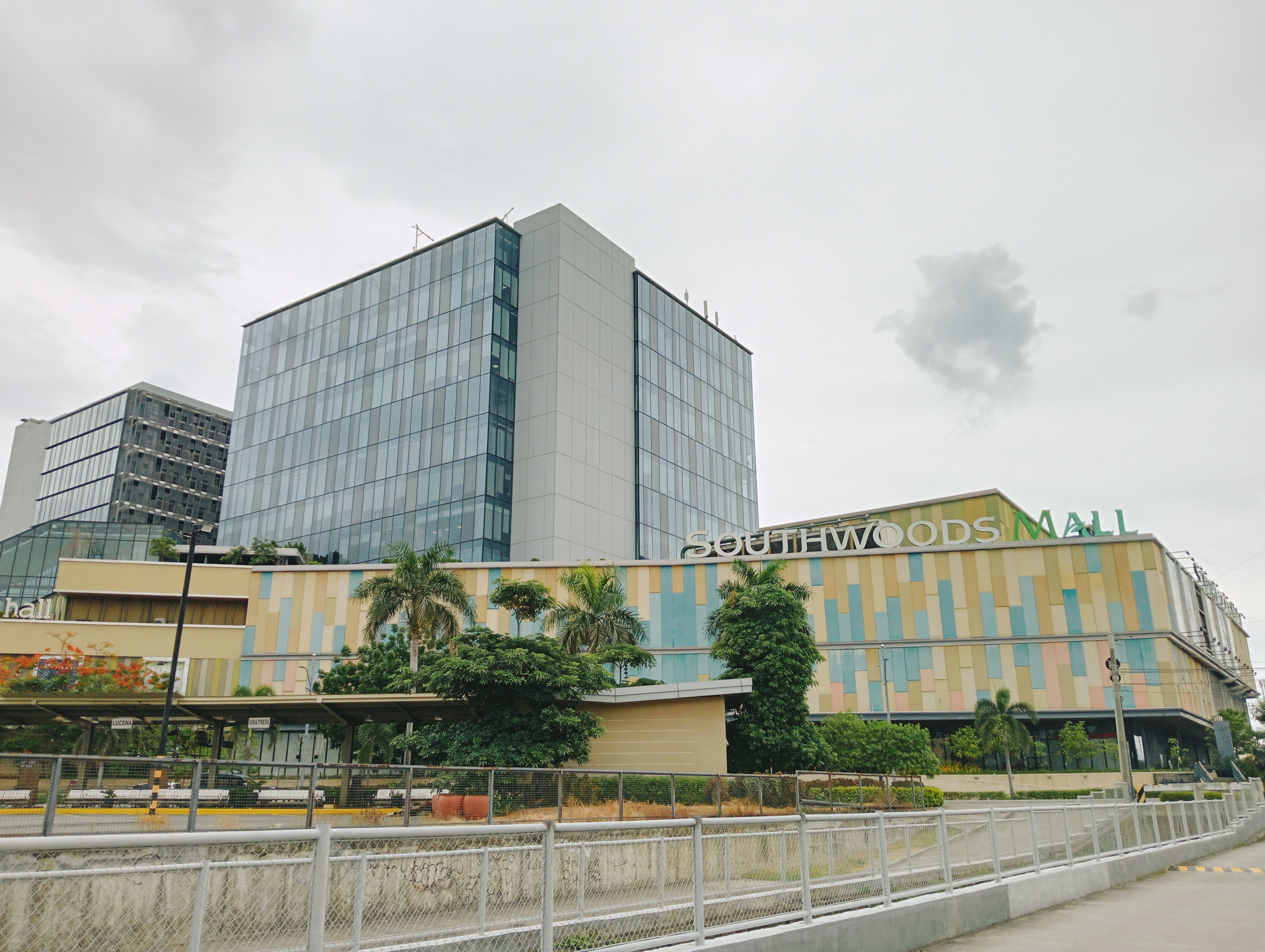
- Southwoods Mall in July 2024
- Coordinates: 14°19′52.9″N 121°03′01.2″E
- Address: Southwoods City, Biñan, Laguna
- Opened: September 30, 2017; 9 years ago
- Developer: Megaworld Corporation
- Manager: Megaworld Lifestyle Malls
- Num. of stores: 82
- Floor area: 58,000 m^{2} (620,000 sq ft)
- Floors: 3

Southwoods Mall is a lifestyle mall development under Megaworld Lifestyle Malls located inside the 561-hectare Southwood City township of Megaworld Corporation in Biñan, Laguna.

== Features ==
The three-level mall offers 58,000 square meters (620,000 sq ft) of shopping, dining, entertainment and leisure. Southwoods Mall features a 24-hour Food Hall, four cinemas, a department store, a Robinsons Supermarket branch, hardware store, toy store and its own transport hub, which is located across Ecocentrum Boulevard. The mall serves as the podium of Southwoods Office Towers, which features two office towers catering BPO companies and is home to more than 10,000 employees.

Southwoods Mall is also known for its open spaces and alfresco areas with gardens and greeneries.

== Gallery ==
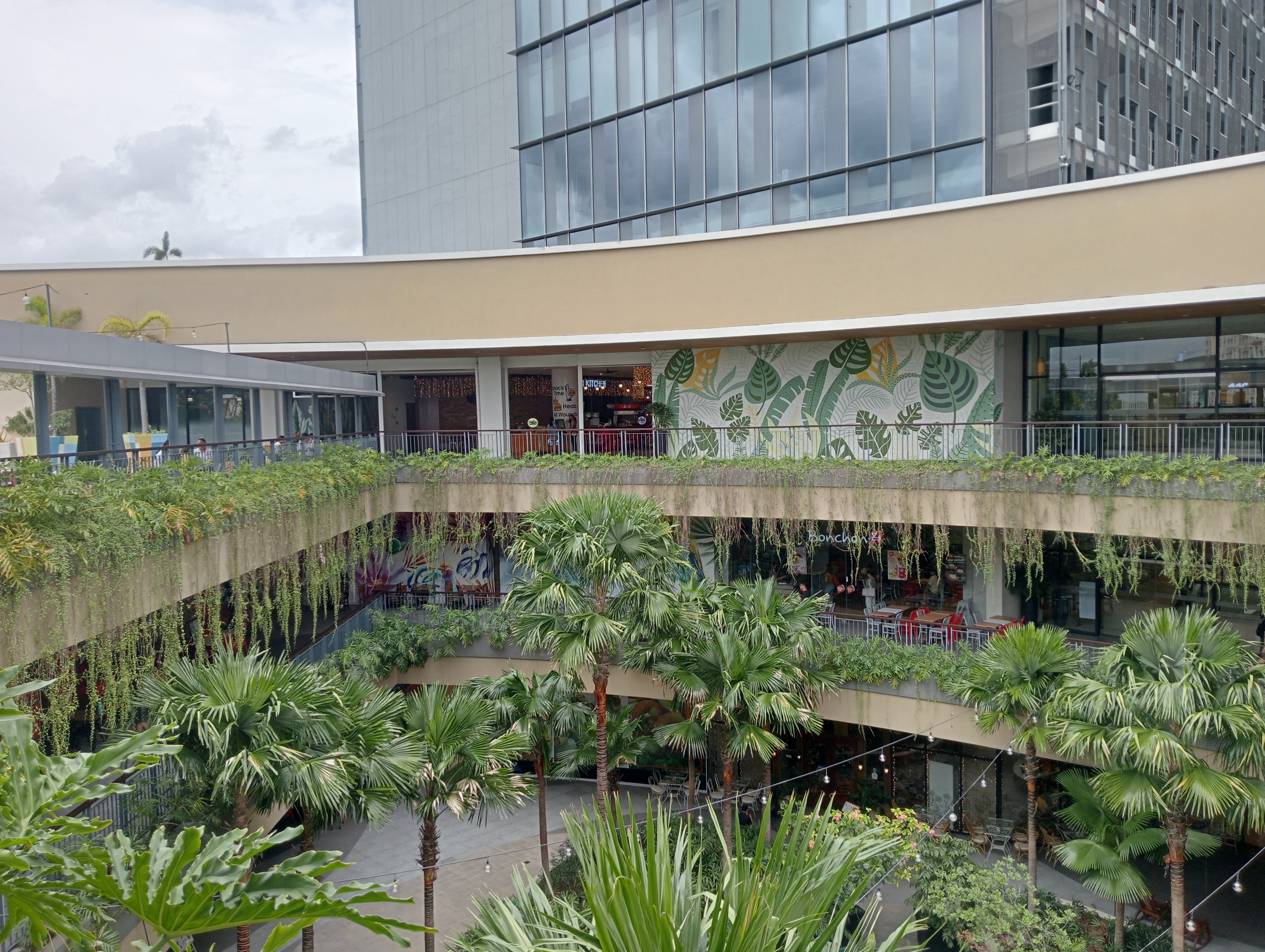
View deck

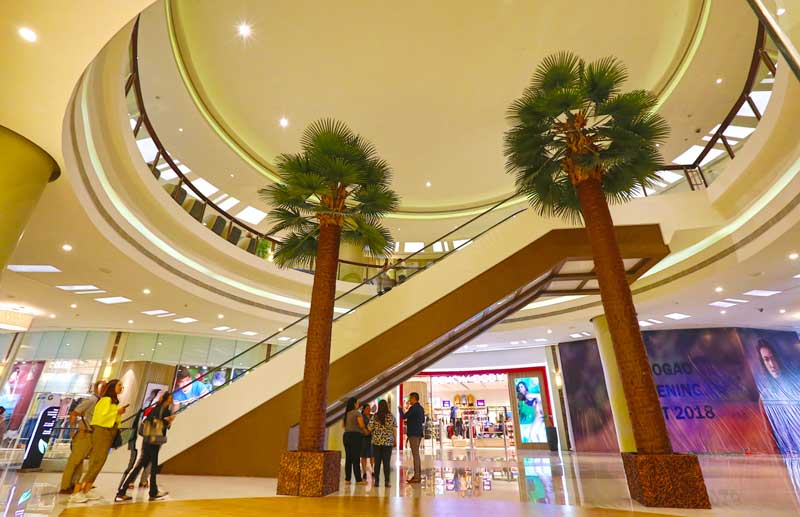
Mall interior

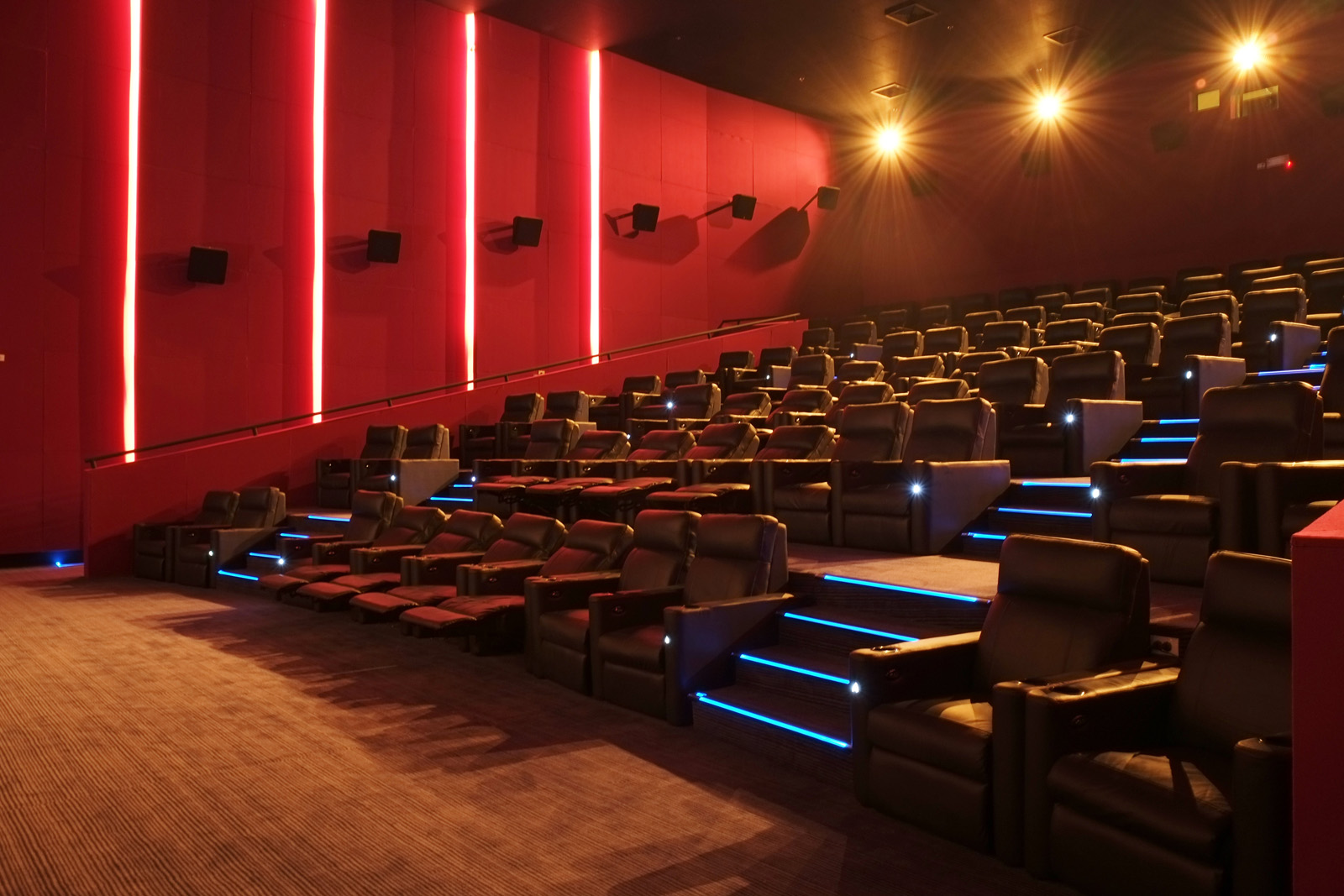
Cinema

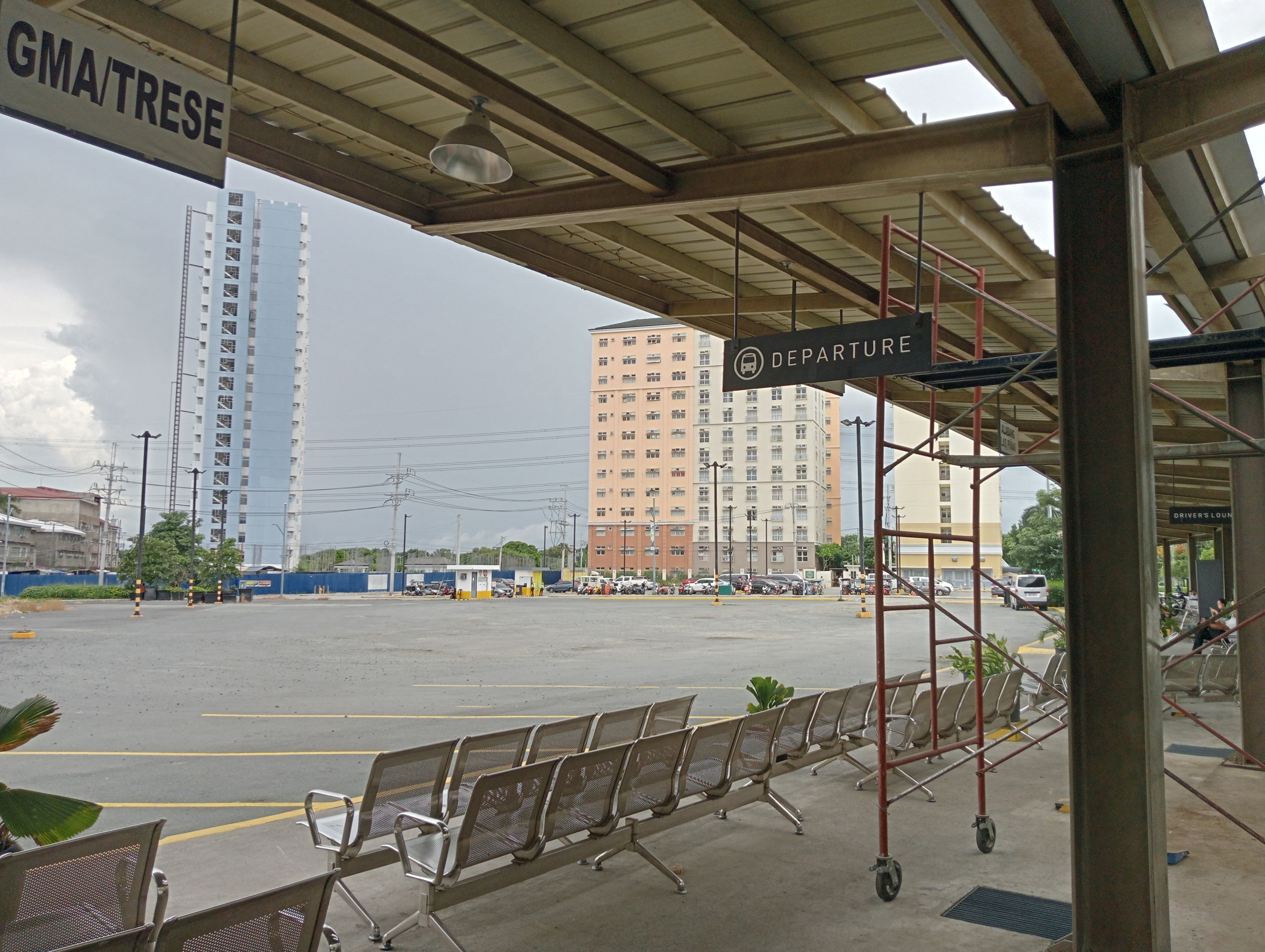
Transport terminal

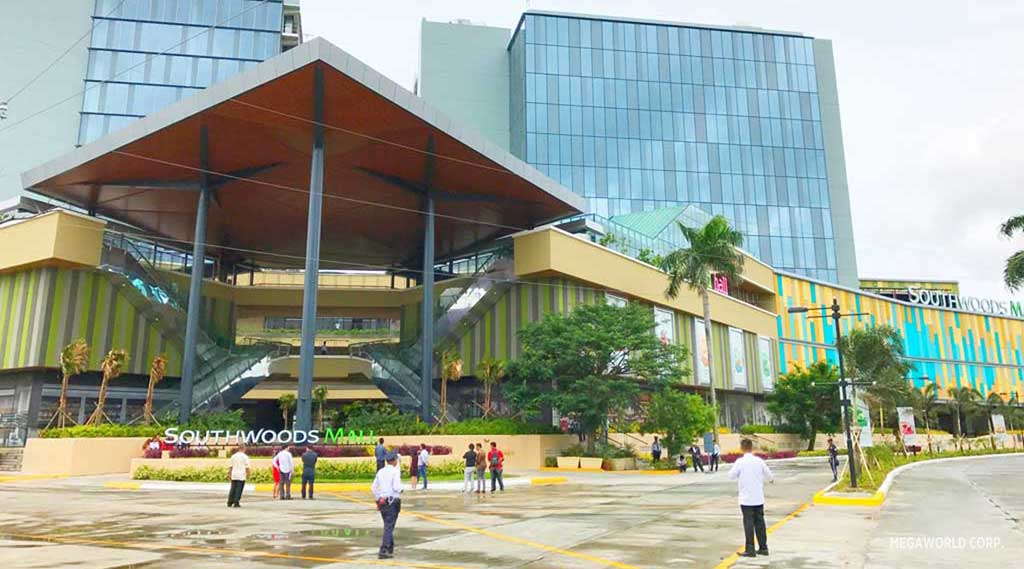
Facade

== See also ==
- Biñan, Laguna
- Eastwood City
- Evia Lifestyle Center
- Robinsons Galleria South
