= Biñan =

Component city in Laguna, Philippines

- Component city
- City of Biñan
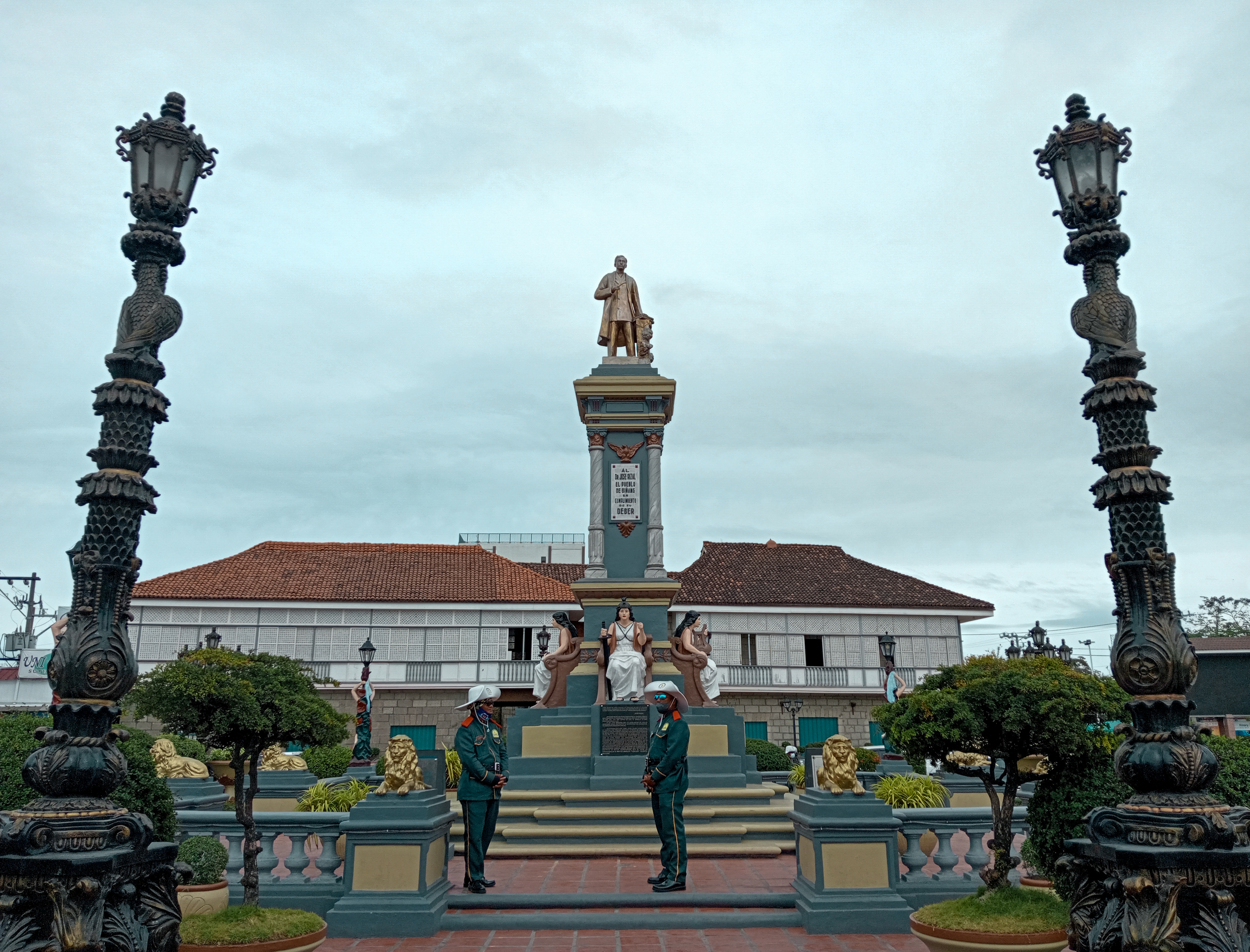
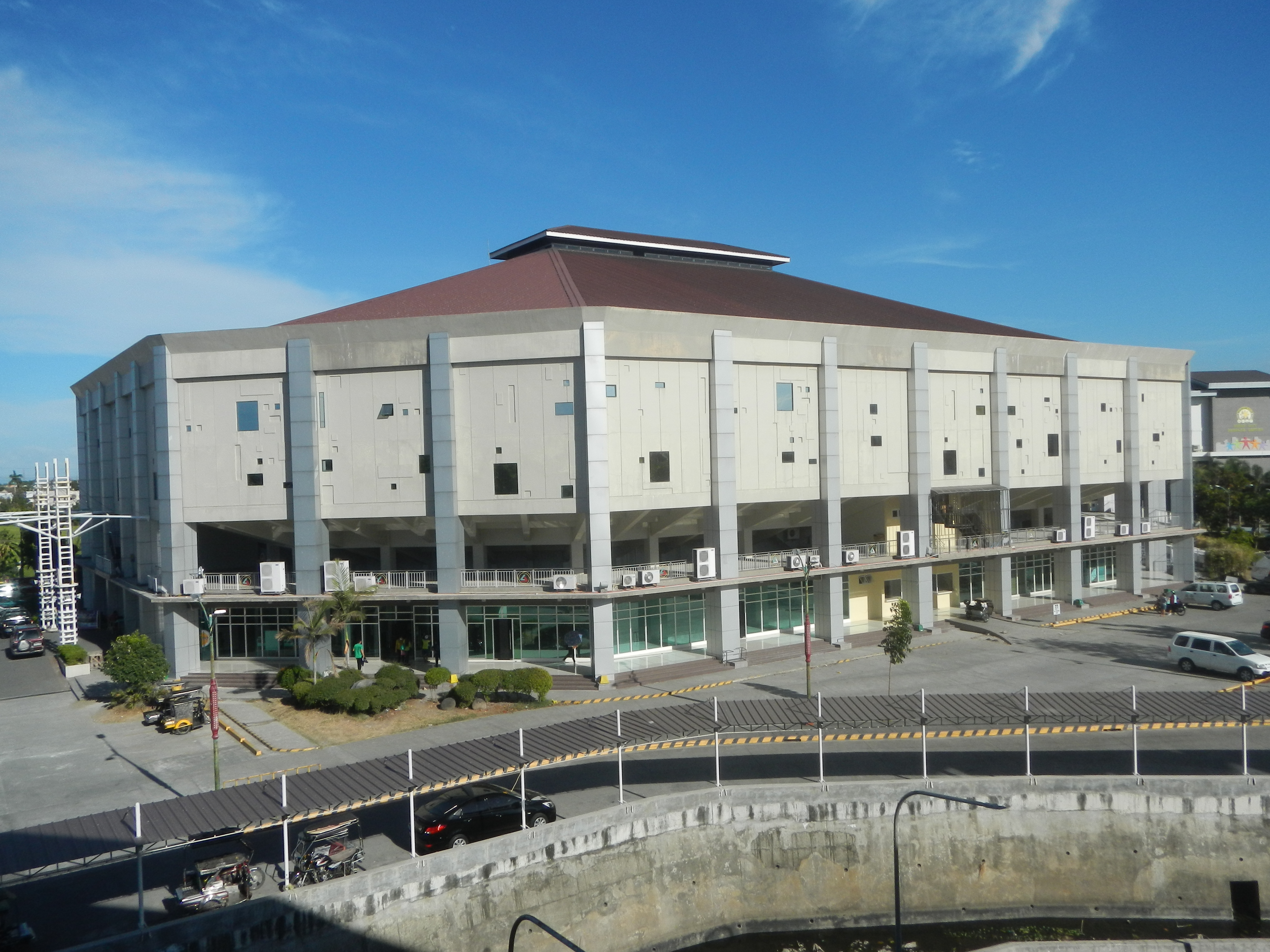
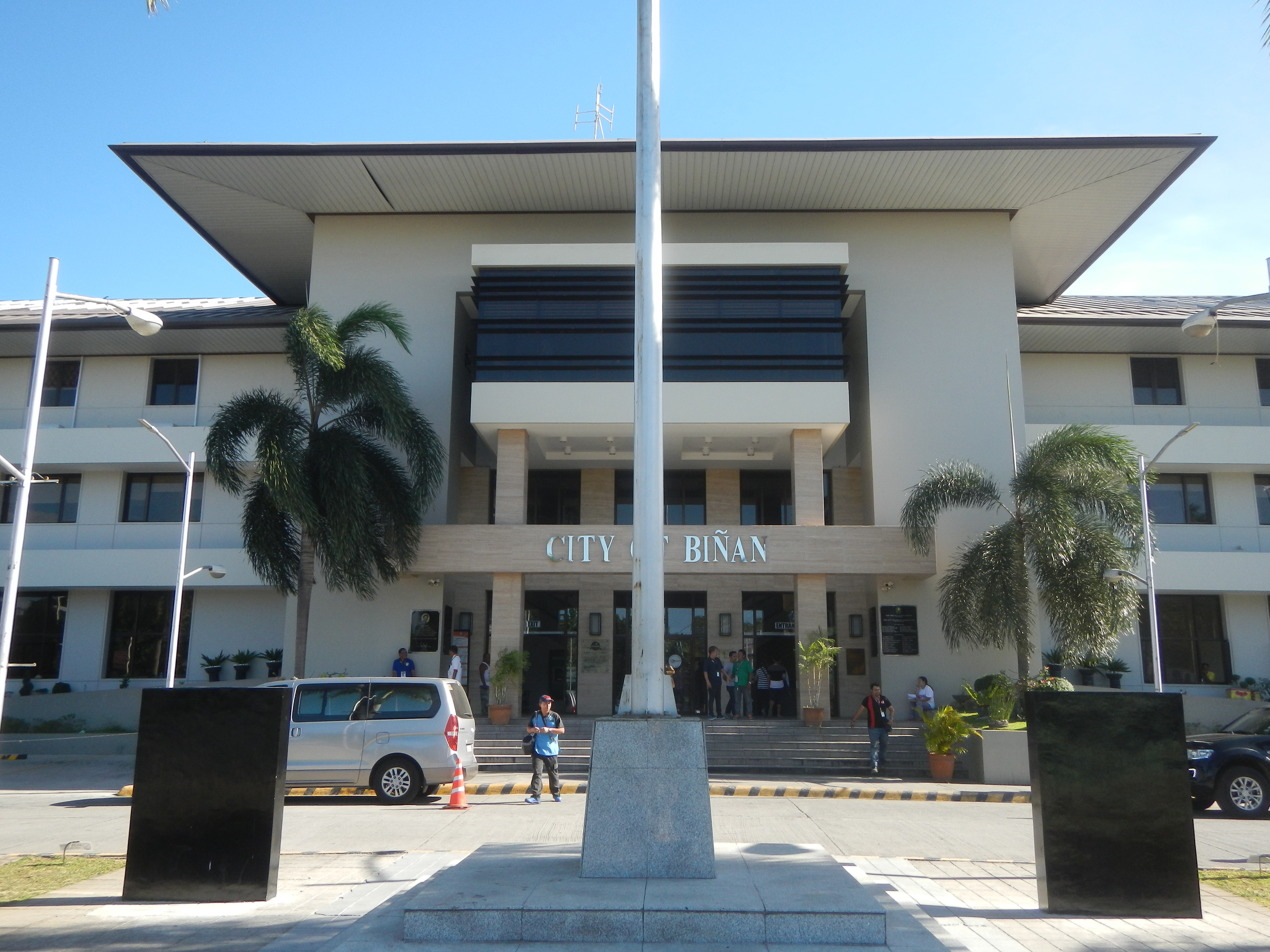
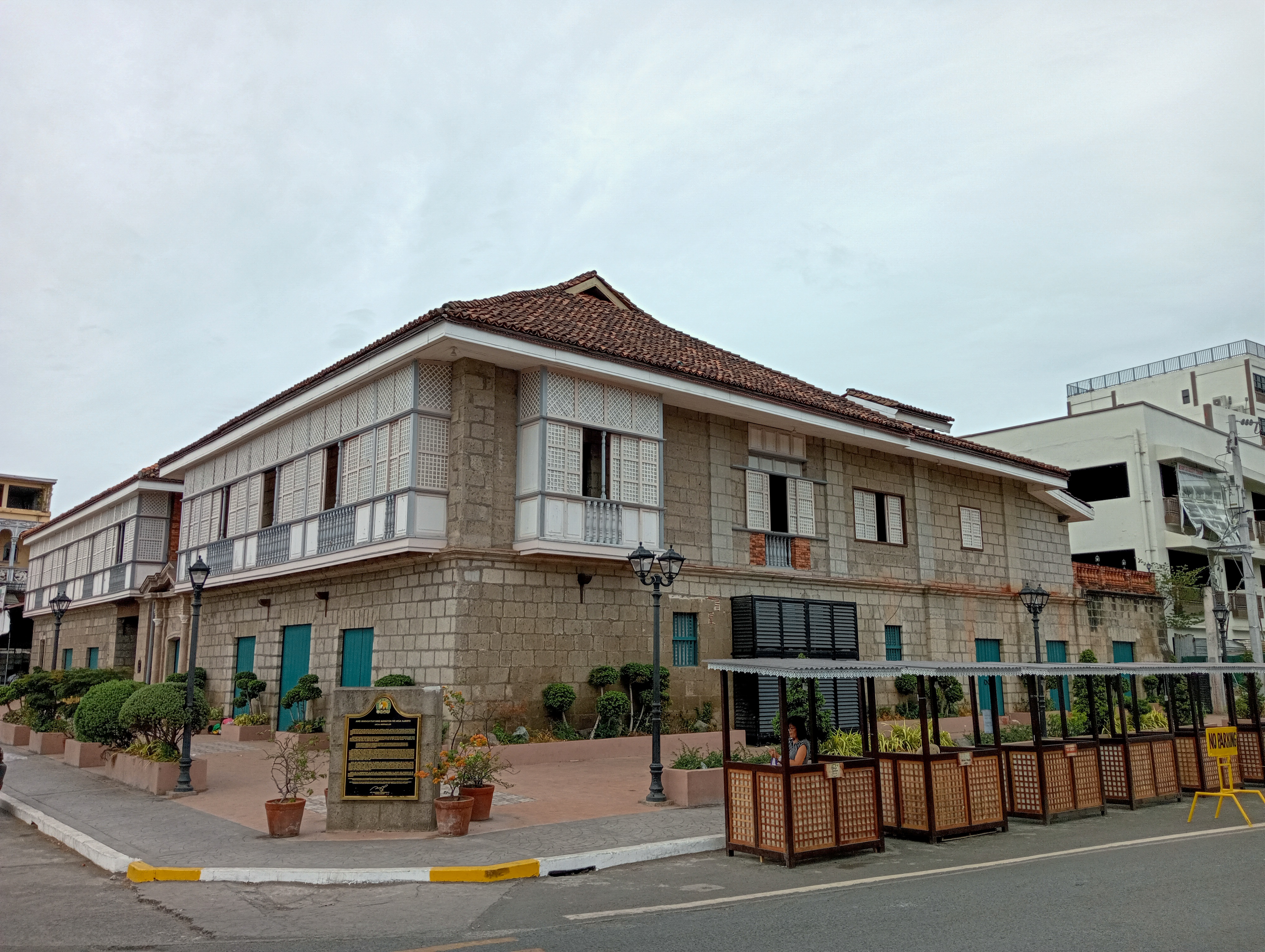
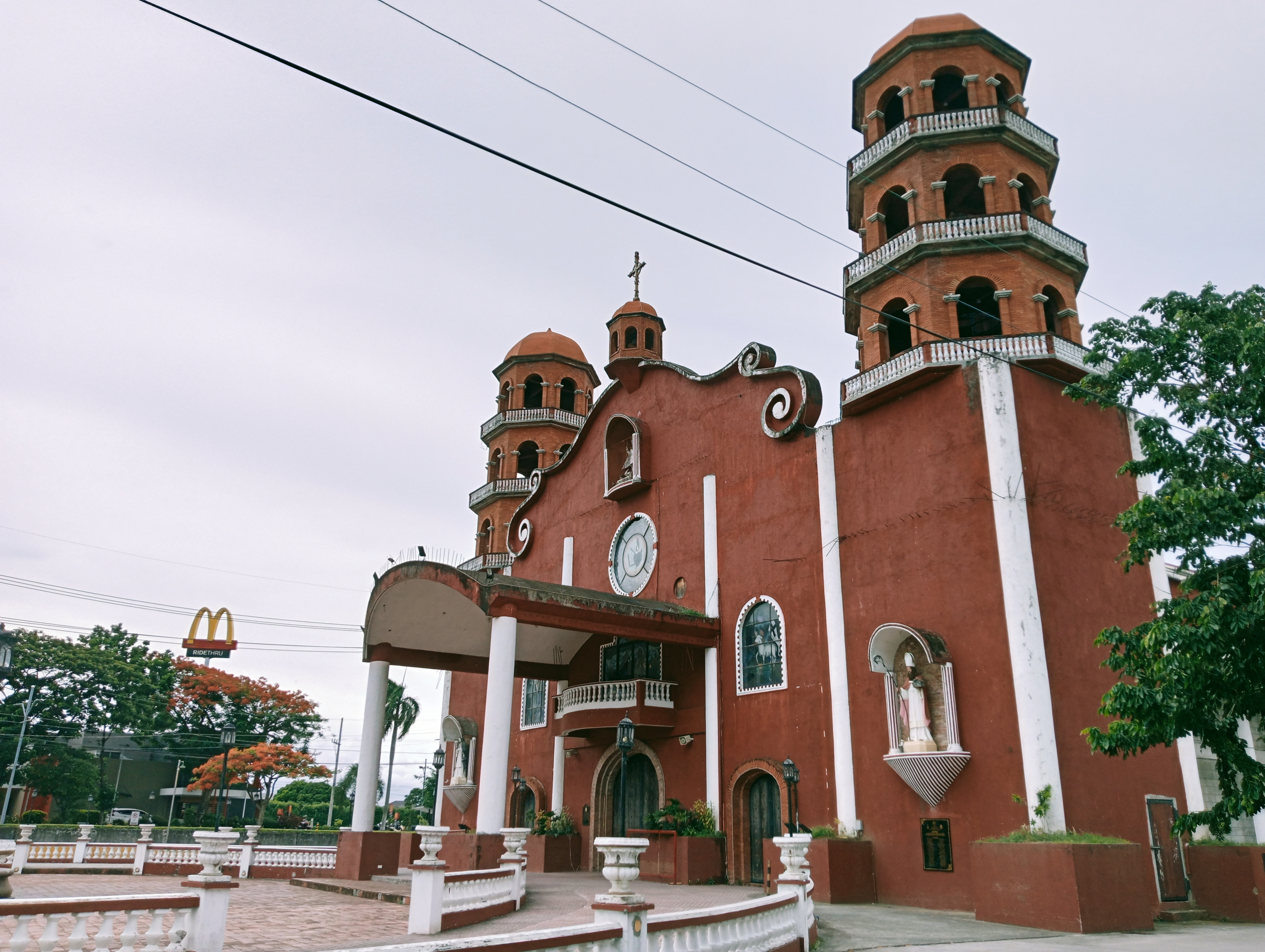
- (From top, left to right: Plaza Rizal · Alonte Sports Arena · City Hall · Alberto Mansion · Santo Niño de Cebu Church)

- Seal
- Nickname: City of Life
- Map of Laguna with Biñan highlighted
- Interactive map of Biñan
- Location within the Philippines
- Coordinates: 14°20′N 121°05′E
- Country: Philippines
- Region: Calabarzon
- Province: Laguna
- District: Lone district
- Founded: February 4, 1747
- Cityhood: February 2, 2010
- Barangays: 24 (see Barangays)

Government
  - Type: Sangguniang Panlungsod
  - Mayor: Angelo B. Alonte (NUP)
  - Vice Mayor: Jonalina R. Reyes (KANP)
  - Representative: Walfredo R. Dimaguila, Jr. (Lakas–CMD)
  - City Council: Members: Libunero O. Alatiit; Liza L. Cardeño; Donna Angela P. Yatco; Rommel R. Dicdican; Arthur R. Dimaguila; Joselle Titus V. Bautista; Elvis L. Bedia; Elmario B. Dimaranan; Alexis H. Desuasido; Christopher A. Alba; Victor L. Cariño; Ingrid Kathrina L. Almeda
  - Electorate: 227,474 voters (2025)

Area
  - Total: 43.50 km^{2} (16.80 sq mi)
- Elevation: 68 m (223 ft)
- Highest elevation: 343 m (1,125 ft)
- Lowest elevation: 2 m (6.6 ft)

Population (2024 census)
  - Total: 584,479
  - Rank: 3 out of 30 (in Laguna)
  - Density: 13,440/km^{2} (34,800/sq mi)
  - Households: 117,720
- Demonym: Biñanense

Economy
  - Income class: 1st city income class
  - Poverty incidence: 4.43% (2023)
  - Revenue: ₱ 3,890 million (2024)
  - Assets: ₱ 11,969 million (2024)
  - Expenditure: ₱ 1,927 million (2024)
  - Liabilities: ₱ 4,500 million (2024)

Service provider
  - Electricity: Manila Electric Company (Meralco)
- Time zone: UTC+8 (PST)
- ZIP code: 4024, 4034 (Laguna Technopark)
- PSGC: 043403000
- IDD : area code: +63 (0)49
- Native languages: Tagalog
- Patron saint: Isidore the Laborer
- Website: www.binan.gov.ph

Biñan (Tagalog pronunciation: [biˈɲan] or traditionally [biˈɲaŋ]), officially the City of Biñan (Filipino: Lungsod ng Biñan), is a component city in the province of Laguna, Philippines. According to the 2024 census, it has a population of 584,479 people, making it the most populous city in the province of Laguna.

Biñan has become both a suburban residential community of Metro Manila and a location for some of the Philippines' largest industrial estates and export processing zones. Prior to its cityhood in 2010, Biñan was the richest municipality in the Philippines with an annual gross income of ₱677 million (US$14.383 million) and net income of ₱250 million (US$5.308 million), as of 2007 by the Commission on Audit.

== Etymology ==
The origin of the name Biñan remains uncertain. One account suggests that before Captain Juan de Salcedo proceeded to Cainta and Taytay en route to Bay, he landed in Biñan. According to tradition, Catholic priests Alfonso de Alvarado and Diego Espinar erected a large wooden cross on the site of the present-day San Isidro Labrador Parish and celebrated a thanksgiving Mass. Local inhabitants gathered, and the missionaries reportedly baptized them, leading to the place being called “Binyagan,” meaning “baptismal place” in Tagalog. The place's root word binyag is believed to have originated from Brunei Malay word which means “to pour water from above,” as noted in the Vocabulario de la lengua tagala. Over time, the Spanish adaptation of the term evolved into “Biñan.”

An 1846 French publication spelled the town's name as Viñan. Other historical references also record variations such as Biniang, Binyang, Binang, and Biñang.

== History ==
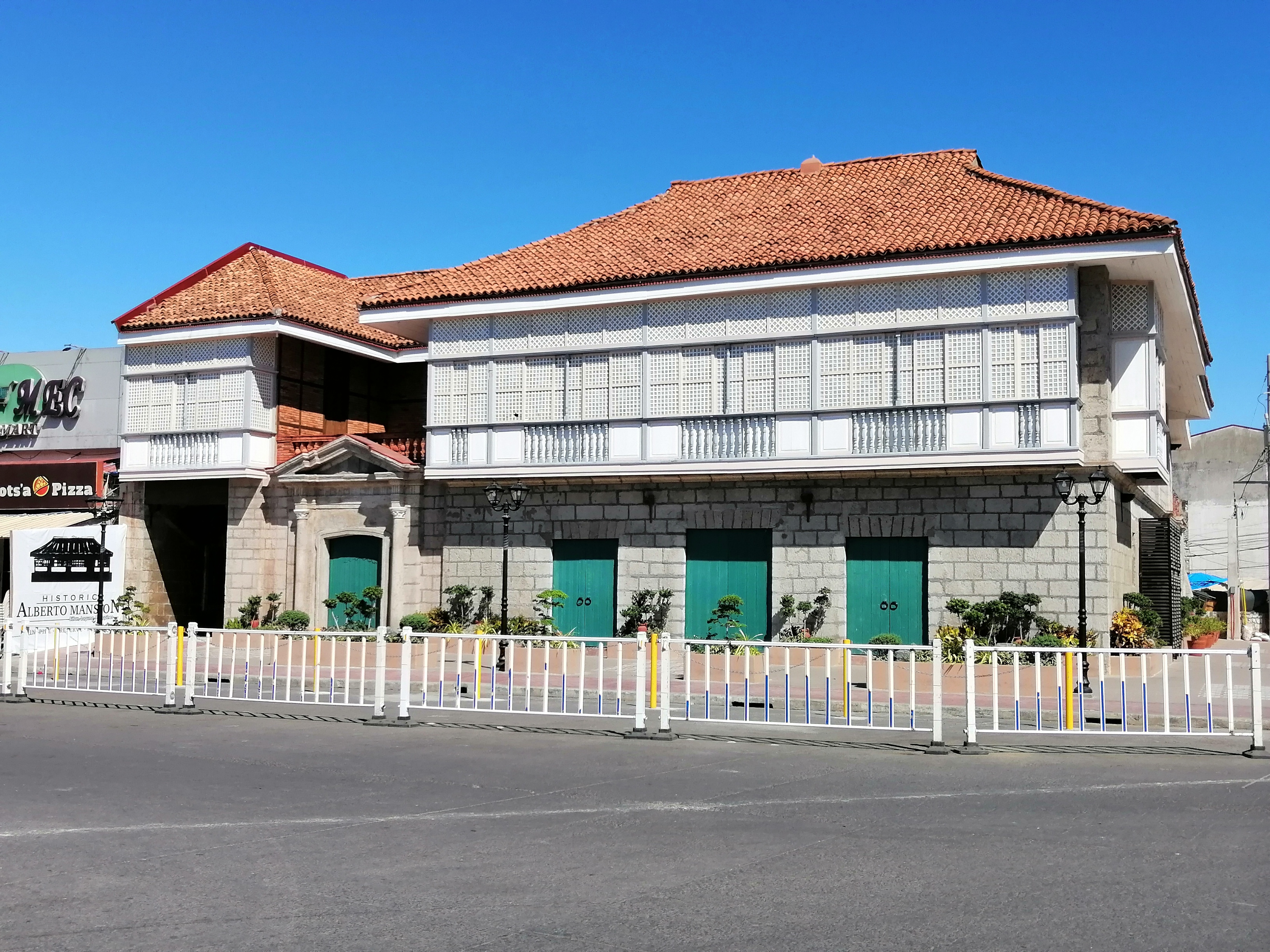
Alberto Mansion

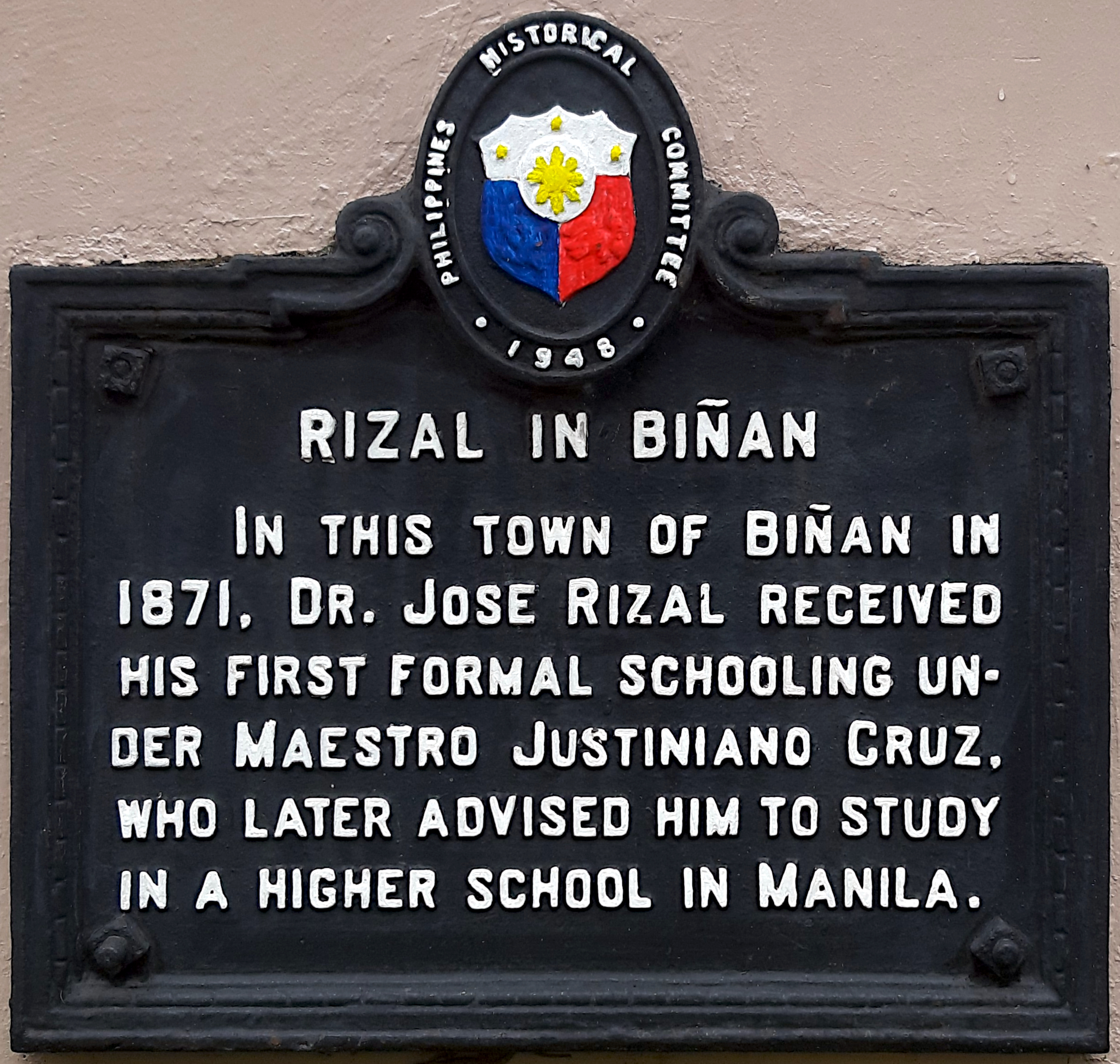
Rizal in Biñan historical marker at the School of Dr. Jose P. Rizal Site and Museum

Captain Juan de Salcedo explored Laguna de Bay and founded Biñan at the end of June 1571, a month after Miguel López de Legazpi established Manila. In 1644, Dominican friars turned the area into a hacienda known as Hacienda de San Isidro Labrador de Biñán, in honor of Saint Isidore the Laborer. When the seat of the provincial government of the Laguna de Bay was transferred from Bay to Pagsanjan in 1688, Biñan separated from Tabuco (present-day city of Cabuyao). In the 1600s Biñan had 256 Chinese-Filipino and 1,639 Native Filipino tributes.

In 1747, the Spaniards officially converted Biñan into a pueblo (town). Santa Rosa separated from Biñan in 1791 and was later established as an independent town on January 18, 1792. The 1818 Spanish census recorded the area having 2,598 native families and 8 Spanish-Filipino families.

Historically, Biñan has gained recognition nationwide for being part of the life of José Rizal, the country's national hero. In June 1869, when Rizal was a child, he traveled to Biñan with his brother Paciano. They moved into his aunt's home, which would serve as their lodging, near the town proper. Here, he received his first formal education through the tutelage of Maestro Justiniano Aquino Cruz and, after a year and a half of instruction, recommended the young Rizal to pursue higher education in Manila. The home where José Rizal resided was given a plaque of appreciation in his honor. Biñan's town square now has a monument in the center honoring Biñan's connection to Rizal.

In 1903, the adjacent towns of Muntinlupa, then part of Rizal province, and San Pedro Tunasan were consolidated with Biñan. Both towns were later separated when Muntinlupa was returned to Rizal as part of Taguig in 1905 and San Pedro Tunasan regained its independent municipality status in 1907.

=== Cityhood ===
On February 2, 2010, by the virtue of Republic Act No. 9740, Biñan became a component city after its voters accepted the ratification in a plebiscite. It became the 4th city in the province and 139th in the Philippines.

By virtue of Republic Act No. 10658, signed on March 27, 2015, by President Benigno Aquino III, Biñan was separated from the first congressional district of Laguna and formed the lone congressional district of Biñan, electing its first district representative to the House of Representatives in 2016. It later gained its separate representation in the Laguna Provincial Board starting in 2025.

== Geography ==
Biñan is located 35 kilometers (22 mi) south of Manila and 52 kilometers (32 mi) from Santa Cruz. It is bounded on the north by San Pedro, on the west by General Mariano Alvarez, Carmona, and Silang, on the south by Santa Rosa, while on the east lies Laguna de Bay, the largest lake in the country.

The city covers a total land area of 43.50 km^{2} (16.80 sq mi) that represents 2.27 percent of the entire Laguna province. In 2024, Biñan had a total population of 584,479. It is the most populated in the province, comprising 15.9% of the provincial population.

=== Topography ===
Biñan is generally plain with 85.33% of its total area having a slope of zero to 2.5%. This covers all the 24 barangays except for small portions of barangays Biñan and San Francisco having a slope ranging from 2.6 to 25%, meaning it is gently sloping to strongly sloping. With more than three-fourths of its area generally level to nearly level, this makes Biñan suitable for agricultural and urban development.

=== Soil properties ===
Of the eleven-soil series that compose the land area of Laguna, Carmona and Gingua series covers about two types that can only be seen in Biñan. Carmona series covers about 2,577 hectares (6,370 acres) or 59.24 percent seen in Biñan's land area. Agricultural land in these areas is primarily devoted to rice and sugar production. Gingua series, on other hand, specifically the fine sandy type covers 315 hectares (780 acres) which is one of the most productive soils in Laguna where a variety of crops especially vegetables are grown profitably. The other two basic soil series comprising Biñan are Guadalupe series covering 660 hectares (1,600 acres) and Lipa series with 798 hectares (1,970 acres).

=== Barangays ===
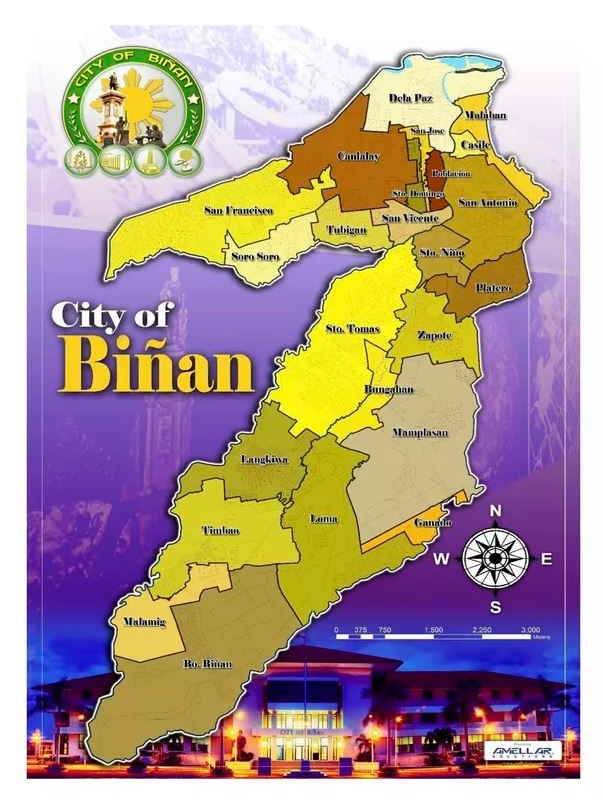
Map of Biñan showing the barangays

Biñan is politically subdivided into 24 barangays - as indicated below - all classified as urban. Each barangay consists of puroks and some have sitios.

Barangay San Francisco occupies the largest area, which is about 16.83 percent of Biñan, while Barangay Casile has the smallest area with only 12 hectares (30 acres) or 0.28 percent.

- Biñan
- Bungahan
- Santo Tomas (Calabuso)
- Canlalay
- Casile
- De La Paz
- Ganado
- San Francisco (Halang)
- Langkiwa
- Loma
- Malaban
- Malamig
- Mampalasan (Mamplasan)
- Platero
- Poblacion
- Santo Niño
- San Antonio
- San Jose
- San Vicente
- Soro-Soro
- Santo Domingo
- Timbao
- Tubigan
- Zapote

=== Climate ===
The climate of Biñan is characterized by two pronounced seasons: dry from November to April and wet during the rest of the year. Maximum rainfall occurs from June to September with an annual average rainfall of 200 mm (7.9 in). Biñan is protected by mountains in the peripheral areas, and thus it is making the area cooler.

Climate data for Biñan, Laguna
Month	Jan	Feb	Mar	Apr	May	Jun	Jul	Aug	Sep	Oct	Nov	Dec	Year
Mean daily maximum °C (°F)	29 (84)	30 (86)	32 (90)	34 (93)	33 (91)	32 (90)	30 (86)	29 (84)	29 (84)	30 (86)	30 (86)	29 (84)	31 (87)
Mean daily minimum °C (°F)	21 (70)	21 (70)	21 (70)	23 (73)	24 (75)	24 (75)	24 (75)	24 (75)	24 (75)	23 (73)	22 (72)	23 (73)	23 (73)
Average precipitation mm (inches)	10 (0.4)	10 (0.4)	12 (0.5)	27 (1.1)	94 (3.7)	153 (6.0)	206 (8.1)	190 (7.5)	179 (7.0)	120 (4.7)	54 (2.1)	39 (1.5)	1,094 (43)
Average rainy days	5.2	4.5	6.4	9.2	19.7	24.3	26.9	25.7	24.4	21.0	12.9	9.1	189.3
Source: Meteoblue

== Demographics ==
Population census of Biñan

Year	Pop.	±% p.a.
1903	9,563	—
1918	10,692	+0.75%
1939	16,238	+2.01%
1948	20,794	+2.79%
1960	33,309	+4.00%
1970	58,290	+5.75%

Year	Pop.	±% p.a.
1975	67,444	+2.97%
1980	83,684	+4.41%
1990	134,553	+4.86%
1995	160,206	+3.32%
2000	201,186	+5.00%
2007	262,735	+3.75%

Year	Pop.	±% p.a.
2010	283,396	+2.79%
2015	333,028	+3.12%
2020	407,437	+4.34%
2024	584,479	+9.05%

Source: Philippine Statistics Authority

=== Religion ===
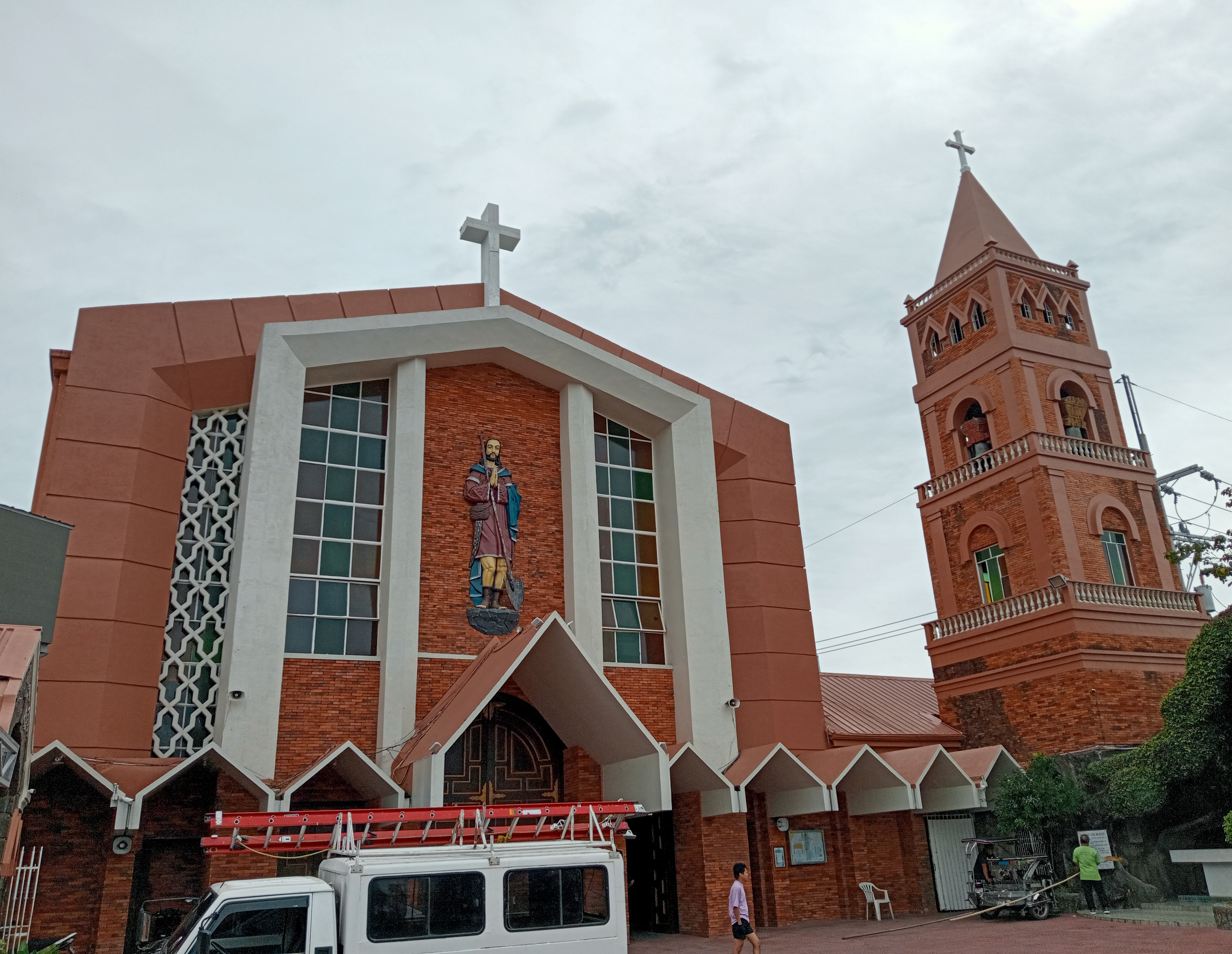
Front view of the Diocesan Shrine and Parish of San Isidro Labrador de Biñan in the old city proper

The majority of the people of Biñan are Roman Catholics. Other religious groups include Jesus Miracle Crusade International Ministry (JMCIM), the Church of Jesus Christ of Latter-day Saints, the Members Church of God International, Iglesia ni Cristo (Church of Christ), Evangelical Christians, United Church of Christ in the Philippines, the United Methodist Church, Presbyterian Churches, Baptist and Bible Fundamental churches.

== Economy ==
Poverty incidence of Biñan (%)

Source: Philippine Statistics Authority

Biñan has been popularly recognized as a trading center area immediately south of Metro Manila. The city has the largest public market in the province of Laguna and in the Calabarzon Region. Retailers from nearby towns often plow the city proper to purchase goods and merchandise intended to be sold elsewhere. Biñan has also been a center of commerce in the region because of the numerous banking institutions across the city, plus the ever-growing number of commercial establishments and emerging shopping centers.

A common sight is the preparations and setting up of the wholesalers and the arrival of jeepneys and trucks carrying various items such as fruits, vegetables, dry goods, dairy products, meat, fish, etc. The market activity would be 24 hours with peak reaching the early hours (3:00–7:00 am PHT) as Filipinos are known to work in the early hours of the day trying to prevent exposure to the heating sun.

The city is also known for a type of pancake made from rice flour, topped with cheese or butter, called Puto Biñan. There are also slices of savory salted egg on top to contrast the mildly sweet pancake base. The best-known makers of Puto in Biñan are located in barangay San Vicente, and the city is renowned as "The Home of the Famous Puto Biñan in Laguna".

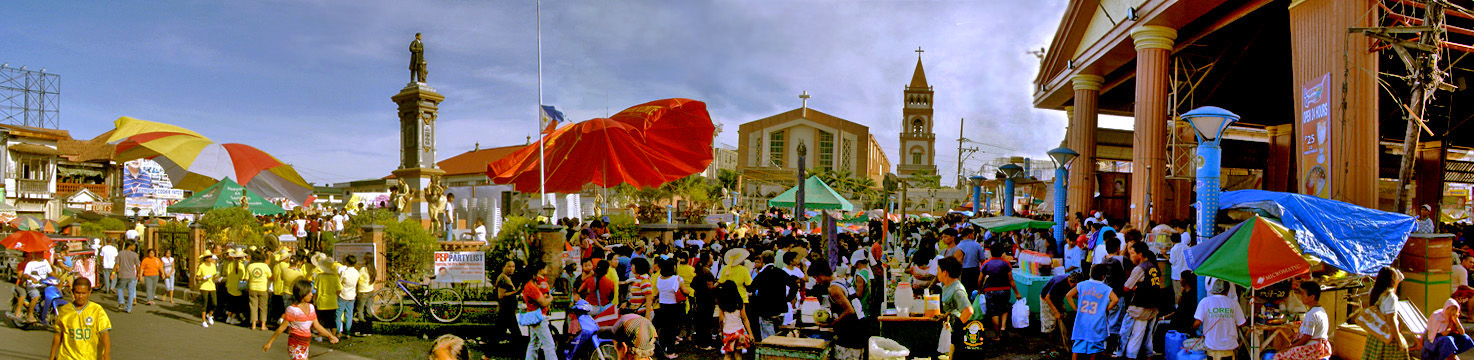
Panoramic view of Plaza Rizal

=== Major industries ===
Manufacturing of footwear, headwear, puto and special pasalubong like pinipig and ampaw are some of the major industries of Biñan.

=== Shopping centers ===
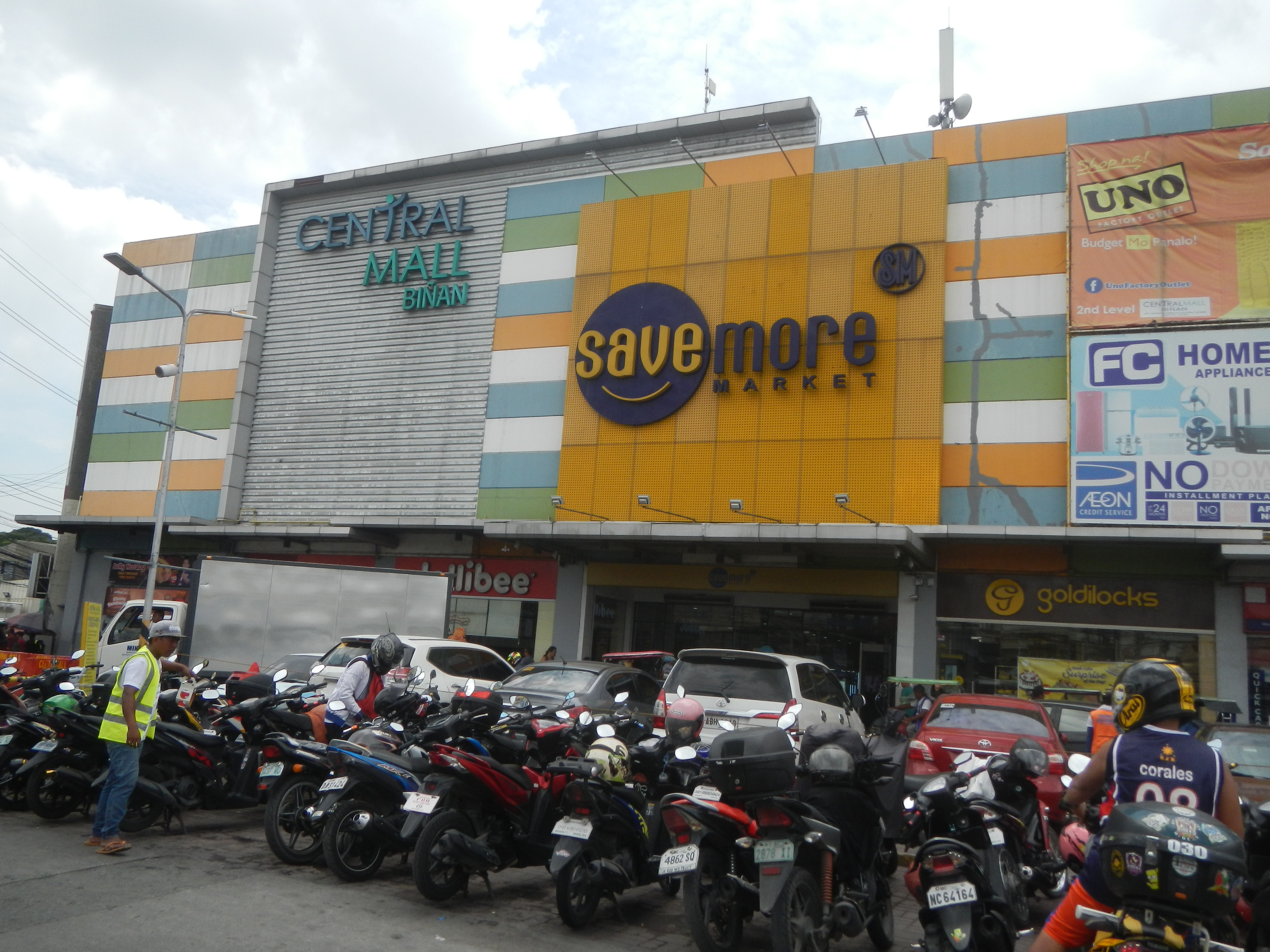
Central Mall Biñan

Notable malls and shopping centers in the city include the Southwoods Mall (managed by Megaworld), Pavilion Mall (managed by Ayala Malls), Central Mall Biñan, C. Morales Mall, and Umbria Commercial Center.

=== Investment sites ===
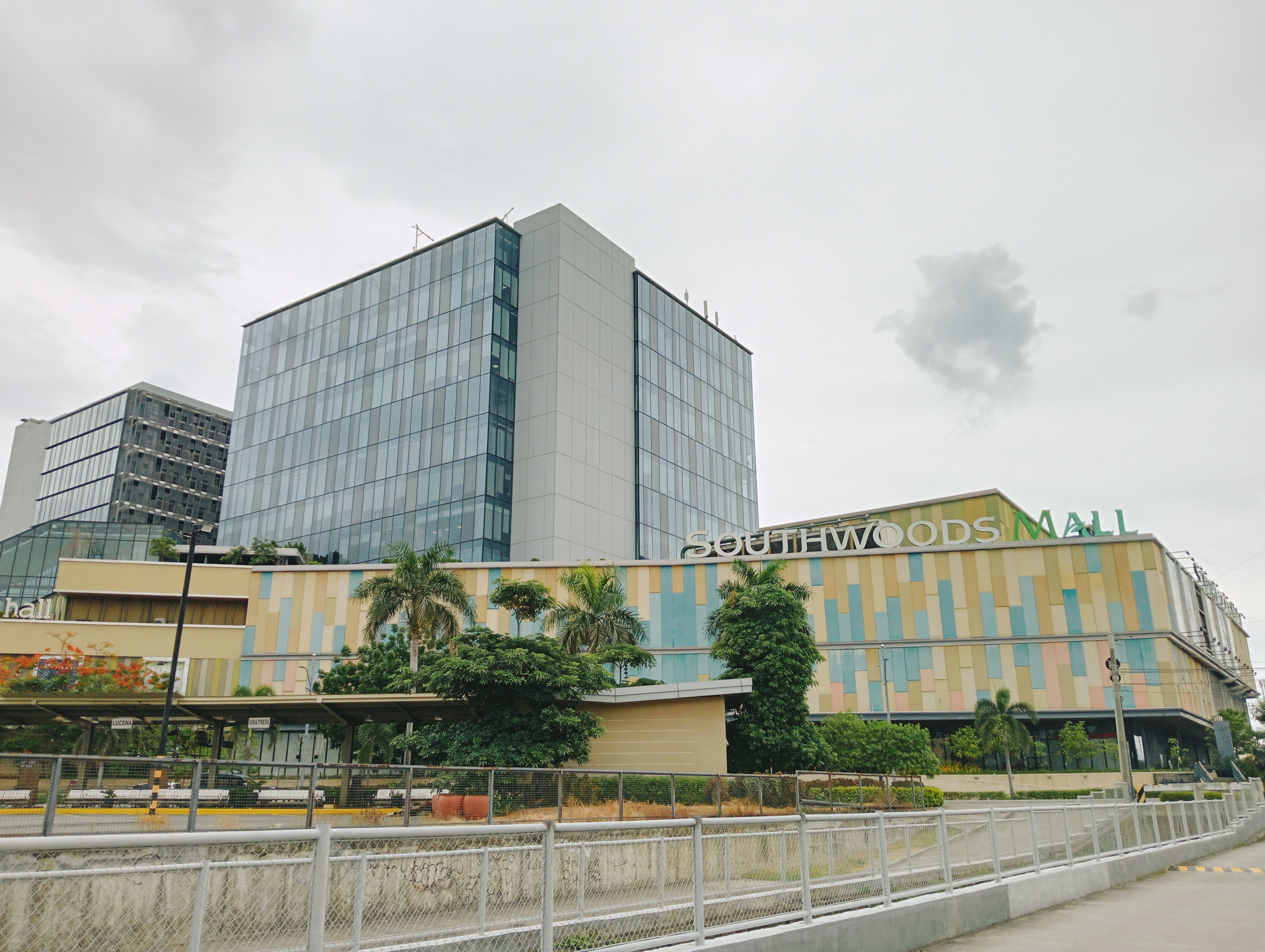
Southwoods Mall, located in Southwoods City

Biñan has two industrial parks namely, the Laguna International Industrial Park (LIIP) and the Laguna Technopark Incorporated (LTI). The two industrial parks have created a good image in the favour of Biñan as well as in the Philippine economy in terms of local employment and the generation of foreign exchange. To date, Biñan has benefited a large number of residents being employed in different companies there. To name a few, they are Honda Parts Manufacturing Corporation, Kito Corporation, Nissin Brake, Ryonan Electric, Cirtek Electronics, SunPower, Nidec Corporation, Isuzu Philippines, Atlas Copco, Diageo, Furukawa Electric, Takata, Toshiba Philippines, Optodev, Inc., Transitions Optical Philippines Inc., Hitachi Computer Products Asia, Amkor Technology Philippines, Inc., Integrated Microelectronics, Inc. (IMI), TDK, Gardenia Bakeries Philippines Inc., and several other multi-national companies.

As of 2008, Biñan, headed by its Historical, Tourism and Cultural Council has formed "Biñan Business Club", a non-government organization composed of all business establishments of the then-municipality. The Biñan Business Club works to anticipate trends and provide support to help local business enterprises and the community face them head on. The Club commits itself to the essential aspects of economic development and poverty alleviation. It knows that the Biñan community counts on the help of the organization to attract, retain and enhance business through traditional and non-traditional strategies.

One Asia Business Center is a 10-hectare (25-acre) development located within the Jubilation New Biñan. This business park will be a major component of an integrated master planned development of Jubilation or what is called the New Biñan City which is composed of residential, commercial, recreational and institutional uses.

Inaugurated on July 25, 2012, Southwoods City, located in Barangay San Francisco, situated at Southwoods Exit along the South Luzon Expressway, has been proclaimed by the Philippine Economic Zone Authority (PEZA) as of July 2010 as a Special Economic Zone. It is a 15-hectare (37-acre) project which includes a strip mall, residential condominium towers, an outlet center, a lifestyle park and a Business Process Outsourcing (BPO) center, the existing Splash Island water park, among other facilities.

Other upcoming developments in Biñan are Greenfield City Biñan, Meadowcrest (by Federal Land), and Broadfield (by Alveo), all in the southern portion of the city.

== Transportation ==
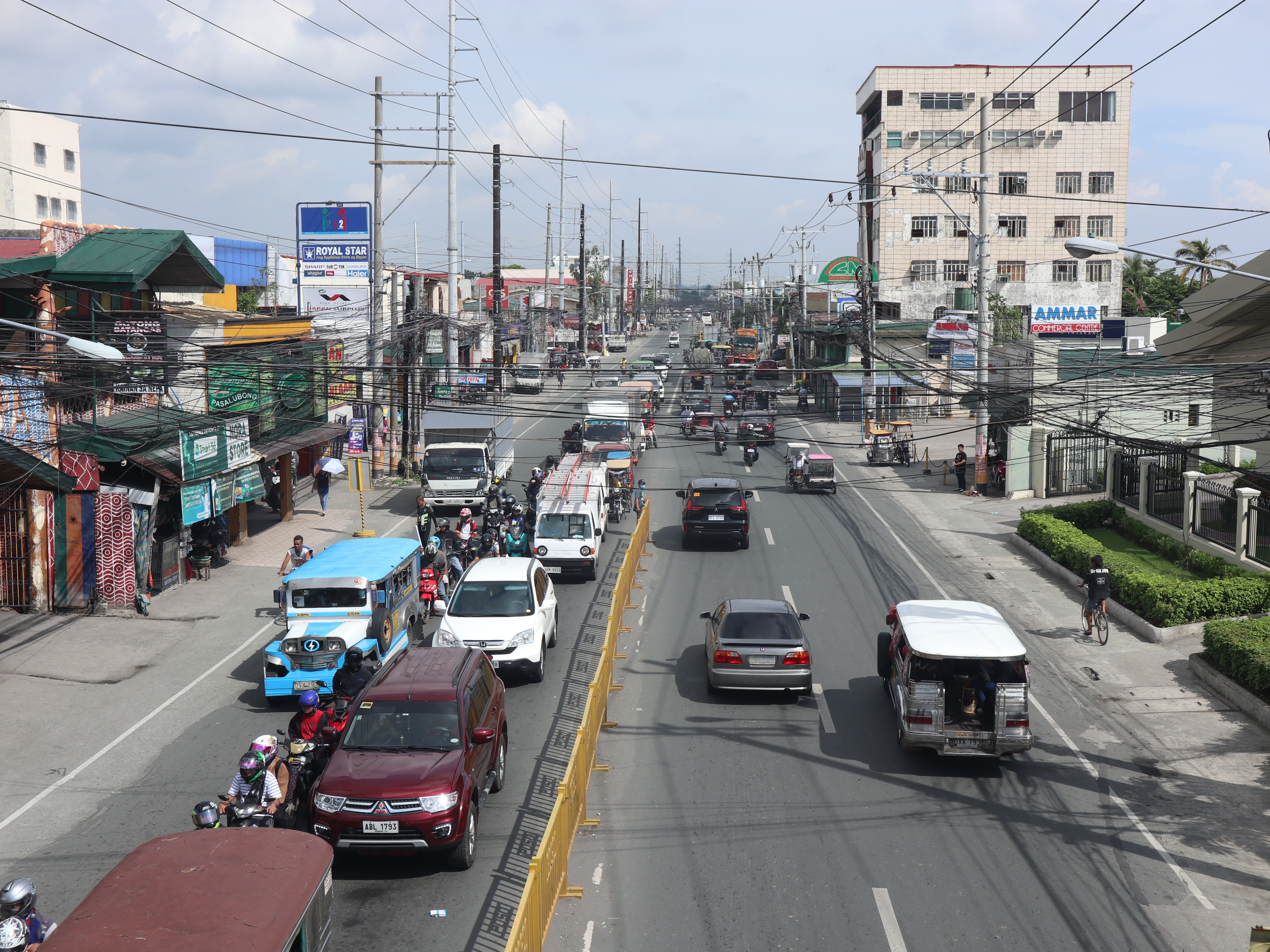
Manila South Road in Barangay Santo Domingo

The city is accessible to all types of land transportation via South Luzon Expressway through Greenfield City/Unilab (Mamplasan), Southwoods, and Carmona exits. The Cavite–Laguna Expressway starts in the city, specifically at Mamplasan Rotonda, and has an interchange near Laguna Technopark Gate 3 and a toll plaza within the city limits. The Manila South Road (N1) also passes through the city. General Malvar Street, mostly part of N65, connects the city to the province of Cavite.

Public transportation within the city, like in most of the urban areas in the Philippines, is facilitated mostly by inexpensive jeepneys and tricycles especially for short distances. The Biñan and Golden City 1 railway stations of the Philippine National Railways (PNR) serve the city. The PNR is slated to be succeeded by the under construction North–South Commuter Railway with one station at Biñan. The old city proper hosts terminals for bus companies that operate routes to and from Metro Manila.

- UV Express

=== Bus lines ===
- JAC Liner
- JAM Liner
- Philtranco
- BBL Trans

== Government ==
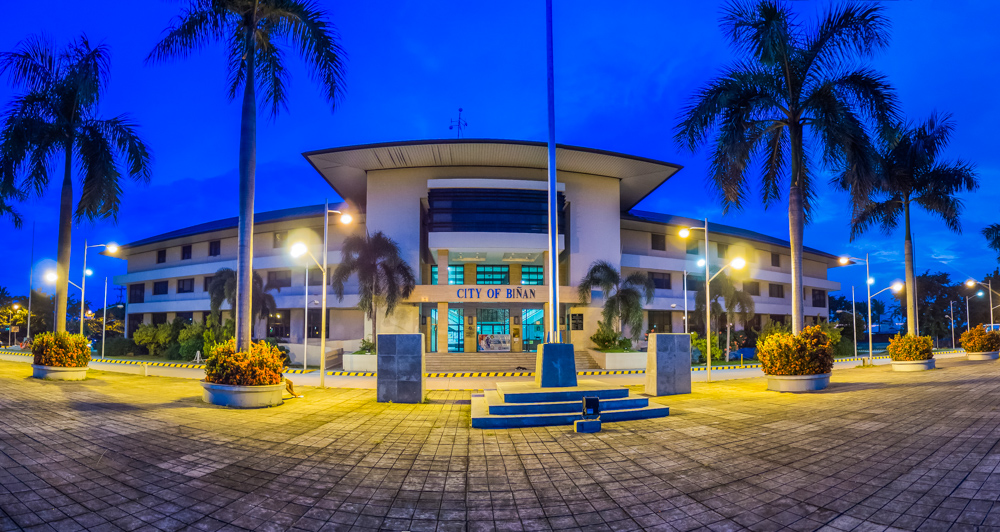
Biñan City Hall at night

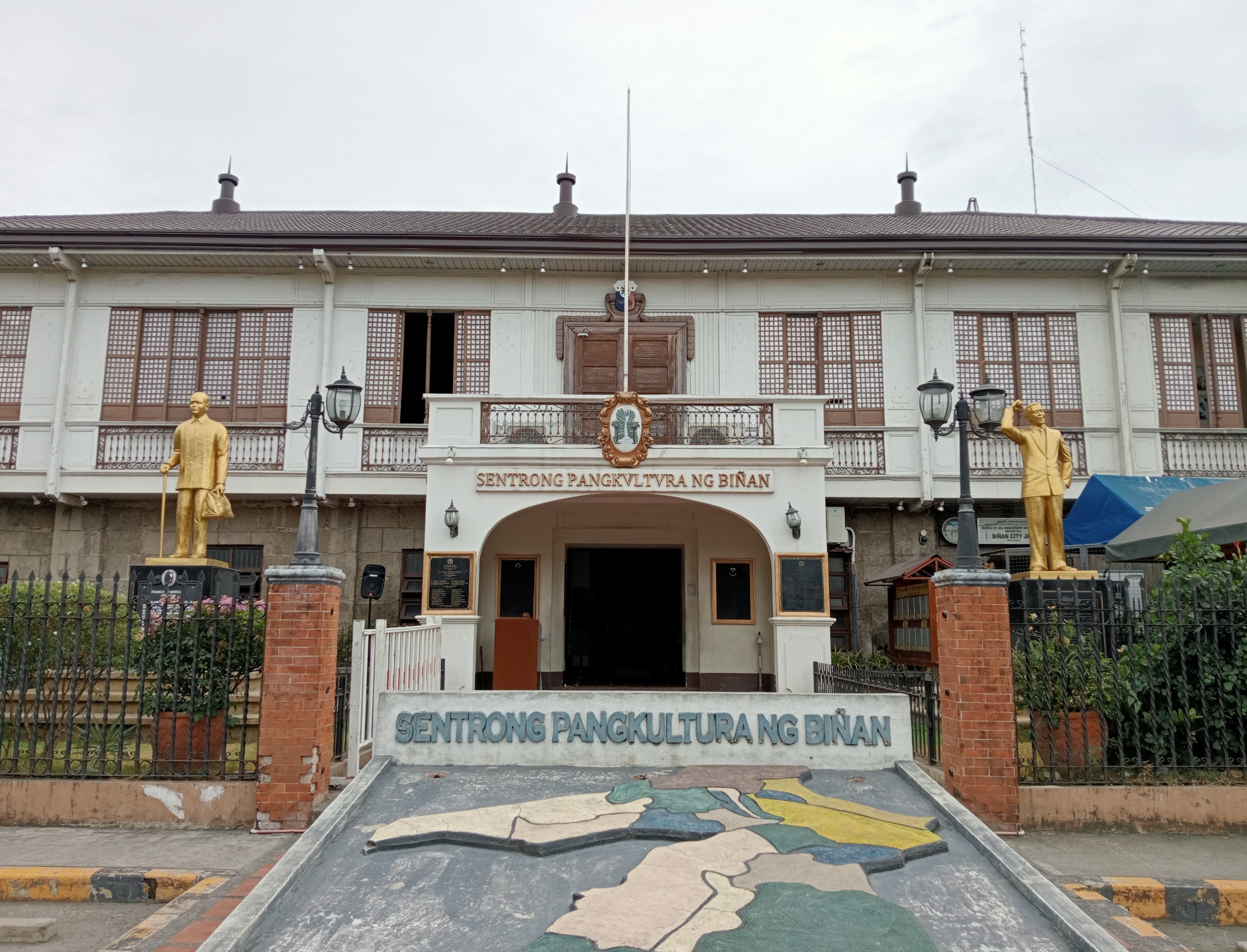
The old Biñan Municipal Hall is the previous seat of municipal government. It now houses the Sentrong Pangkultura ng Biñan.

Biñan is classified as a component city. The mayor is the chief executive and is assisted by the vice mayor, who presides over a legislative council consisting of 14 members: 12 elected members at-large, the President of the Sangguniang Kabataan (Youth Council) Federation representing the youth sector, and the President of the Association of Barangay Chairmen (ABC) as barangay sectoral representative. The council is in charge of creating the city's policies in the form of Ordinances and Resolutions. Additionally, the city elects a member to the House of Representatives and two members to the Laguna Provincial Board for its lone legislative district.

The incumbent mayor is Angelo Alonte, who previously served as the city's vice mayor. Jonalina Reyes is the incumbent vice mayor. It is represented in the Congress by Walfredo Dimaguila Jr., a former mayor of the city.

The new Biñan City Hall in Barangay Zapote currently serves as the seat of city government. It was constructed to reflect its status as a component city. It succeeded the former municipal hall in Barangay Poblacion (old town proper) and has been repurposed as the Sentrong Pangkultura ng Biñan (lit. transl. Cultural Center of Binan). This initiative aims to preserve and promote the city's rich cultural and artistic heritage.

=== Elected officials ===
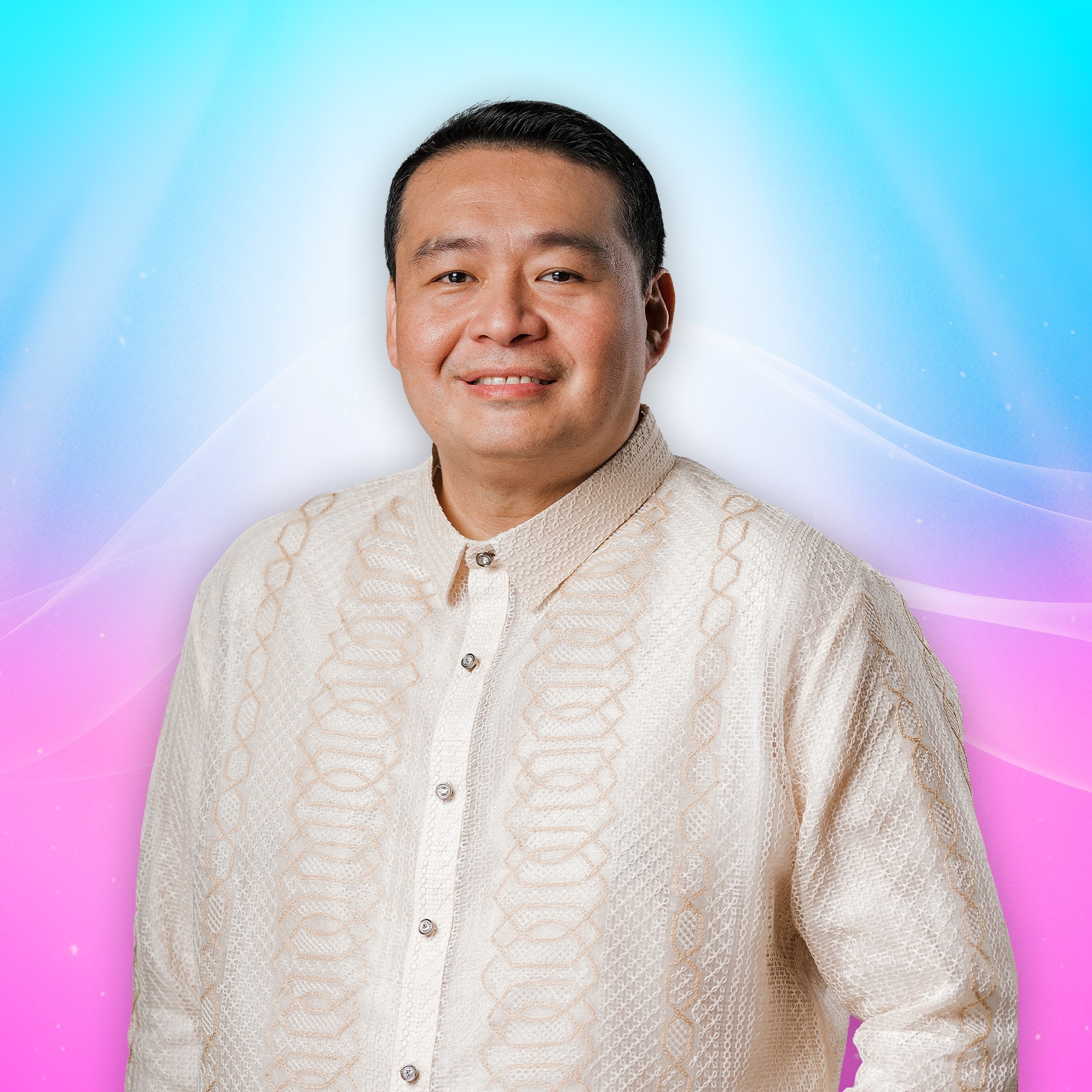
Angelo Alonte, the incumbent mayor of Biñan since 2025

Biñan City Officials (2025-2028)
Name	Party
House of Representatives
Walfredo R. Dimaguila Jr.	Lakas
City Mayor
Angelo B. Alonte	NUP
City Vice Mayor
Jonalina R. Reyes	KANP
City Councilors
Libunero O. Alatiit	NUP
Liza L. Cardeño	Lakas
Donna Angela P. Yatco	Aksyon
Rommel R. Dicdican	NUP
Arthur R. Dimaguila	Lakas
Joselle Titus V. Bautista	Lakas
Elvis L. Bedia	NUP
Elmario B. Dimaranan	NUP
Alexis H. Desuasido	Lakas
Christopher A. Alba	NUP
Victor L. Cariño	NUP
Ingrid Kathrina L. Almeda	Lakas
Ex Officio City Council Members
ABC President	Geminiano "Manong" B. Catalon (San Francisco (Halang))
SK President	Alonzo Kyne S. Garcia - (San Vicente)

=== City seal ===
In 2026, a new seal of Biñan was unveiled, replacing the one introduced in 2010. The seal, according to City Ordinance No. 21-2026, symbolized the following:

- The Rizal Monument at the center is used to depict the heroism of the National Hero of the Philippines, Dr. José Rizal, who had his first formal education at Biñan under the tutelage of Maestro Justiniano Aquino Cruz who after a year and a half of tutelage advised the young Rizal to continue his education in Manila.
- The “1747” represents the founding year of Biñan as a town, as determined in Historia Geografica: Geografica y Estadistica de Filipinas (1876) by Agustín de la Cavada.
- The “2010” represents the year that Republic Act No. 9740 was signed into law creating the City of Biñan and ratified by majority vote of its people during the plebiscite held on February 2, 2010.
- Shield is derived from the provincial shield of Laguna, reflecting the city's identity and shared heritage within the province.
  - Maglalatik on the upper left represents the traditional folk dance of Biñan, highlighting the city's cultural identity and enduring commitment to the performing arts.
  - Industries on the upper right symbolizes the manufacturing, innovation, and economic progress driven by industrial zones in the city such as Laguna Technopark and Laguna International Industrial Park (LIIP)
  - Puto Biñan on the lower left represents the city's well-known delicacy, cottage industries, craftsmanship, and livelihood, as well as its commitment to preserving local history, heritage, and traditional homegrown industries. ** The torch on the lower right symbolizes the pursuit of knowledge, excellence, and innovation, reflecting the city's dedication to education and intellectual growth.
- The Laguna Lake, which cuts through the shield, represents the body of water closely tied to the city's geography, history, and livelihood, particularly for its lakeside communities.
- The two stars on the outer seal represent the official motto "Service and Integrity."
- The 24 rice grains represent Biñan's 24 barangays, reflecting the city's origins as an agricultural community.
- The green and yellow colors symbolize Biñan's agricultural roots and "City of Life" identity. Green symbolizes growth and renewal, whereas yellow signifies energy, optimism, and abundance.

=== The Lone District of Biñan ===
On January 26, 2015, a 15–0 vote from senators approved the House Bill No. 3917 in the third and final reading, amending the charter city of Biñan to a congressional district in Laguna and will be separated from the first district. Republic Act No. 10658, which President Aquino signed into law on March 27, 2015, separated Biñan from the first legislative district of Laguna. Under the law, the incumbent representative of the first district of Laguna will continue to represent the new district until the expiration of his term. The Commission on Elections was tasked to issue the necessary rules and regulations to implement the measure within 30 days after its effectivity.

== Education ==
The University of Perpetual Help System Laguna

Biñan is also considered the educational center of the first legislative district of Laguna, having the greatest number of secondary and tertiary schools in the area. Most barangays in the city also have their own respective public elementary schools.

Biñan has 3 universities: the University of Perpetual Help System Laguna, the first university in the city, located at Barangay Santo Niño via the National Highway; the Biñan campus of the Polytechnic University of the Philippines, located at Barangay Zapote; and the Laguna Campus of De La Salle University at Barangays Malamig and Biñan.

Some other prominent schools and colleges in the city include:

Local educational institutions

- AMA Biñan Campus
- Caritas Don Bosco School
- Colegio San Agustin – Biñan
- La Consolacion College – Biñan
- Saint Michael's College of Laguna
- Alpha Angelicum Academy
- Ann Arbor Montessori Learning Center – Biñan Campus
- Biñan Integrated National High School
- Biñan National High School (Dela Paz Annex)
- Biñan Secondary School of Applied Academics
- Biñan City Science and Technology High School
- Casa Del Niño Montessori School – Biñan Branch
- Catholic School of Pacita
- Citi Global College (formerly Don Bosco Global College-Biñan)
- Colegio San Antonio-Biñan (formerly Saint Anthony School of Biñan)
- Escuela de Gracia of Binan Inc
- HeadStarter Workshop
- Holy Family of Nazareth School
- Holy Infant Jesus Of Prague School
- Holy Spirit School
- Integrated Jubilation Montessori Center of Biñan (Formerly International Jubilation Montessori Center of Biñan)
- International Electronics And Technical Institute (IETI)-Biñan
- Jacob Alfred A. Young School – Biñan
- Jacobo Z. Gonzales Memorial National High School
- Jacobo Z. Gonzales Memorial School Of Arts And Trades, a technical-vocational school
- Kidsfirst Integrated School
- KIDS HAUS-Child Development Center Integrated School
- Lake Shore Educational Institution
- Liceo De Santo Tomas De Aquinas
- Biñan Elementary School
- Malaban East Elementary School
- Malaban Elementary School
- Mamplasan Elementary School
- Manila Montessori School
- Montessori Children's Workshop
- Nereo Joaquin National High School
- Nereo R. Joaquin National High School
- Panorama Montessori School
- Saint-Sebastien Elementary school
- San Francisco Elementary School
- San Vicente Elementary School
- South City Homes Academy
- St. Francis of Assisi College
- Santa Catalina College – Biñan
- Trimex Colleges

International schools

- The Beacon Academy
- Brent International School Manila

== Notable people ==
- Ambrosio Rianzares Bautista, lawyer and author of the Declaration of Philippine Independence
- Fernando Canon, Filipino revolutionary general, poet, inventor, engineer, musician
- Francisco Rizal Mercado, father of Dr Jose Rizal
- Encarnacion Alzona, National Scientist of the Philippines for Philippine History
- Dioscoro L. Umali, National Scientist of the Philippines for Agriculture and Rural Development
- Conrado M. Vasquez, first Ombudsman of the Philippines and an Associate Justice of the Supreme Court of the Philippines.
- Norberto S. Amoranto, 5th Mayor of Quezon City
- Ronnie Alonte, actor, singer, dancer
- Angeli Gonzales, doctor
- Ken Chan, Filipino-Chinese actor
- Zephanie Dimaranan, first grand winner of Idol Philippines
- Barbie Forteza, actress
- Rose Ann Gonzales, multi-awarded former child actress
- Precious Lara Quigaman, actress, Miss International 2005
- Marco Sison, OPM icon, singer/actor, recording artist, former Laguna Board Member and former Biñan councilor
- Izzy Trazona, former member of SexBomb Girls
- Filomena Almarines, folk saint
- Chris Javier, basketball player
- Maurice Shaw, basketball player

== Sister cities ==
Local

- Cabuyao, Laguna
- Santa Rosa, Laguna
