= School of Dr. Jose P. Rizal Site and Museum =

Museum in Laguna, Philippines

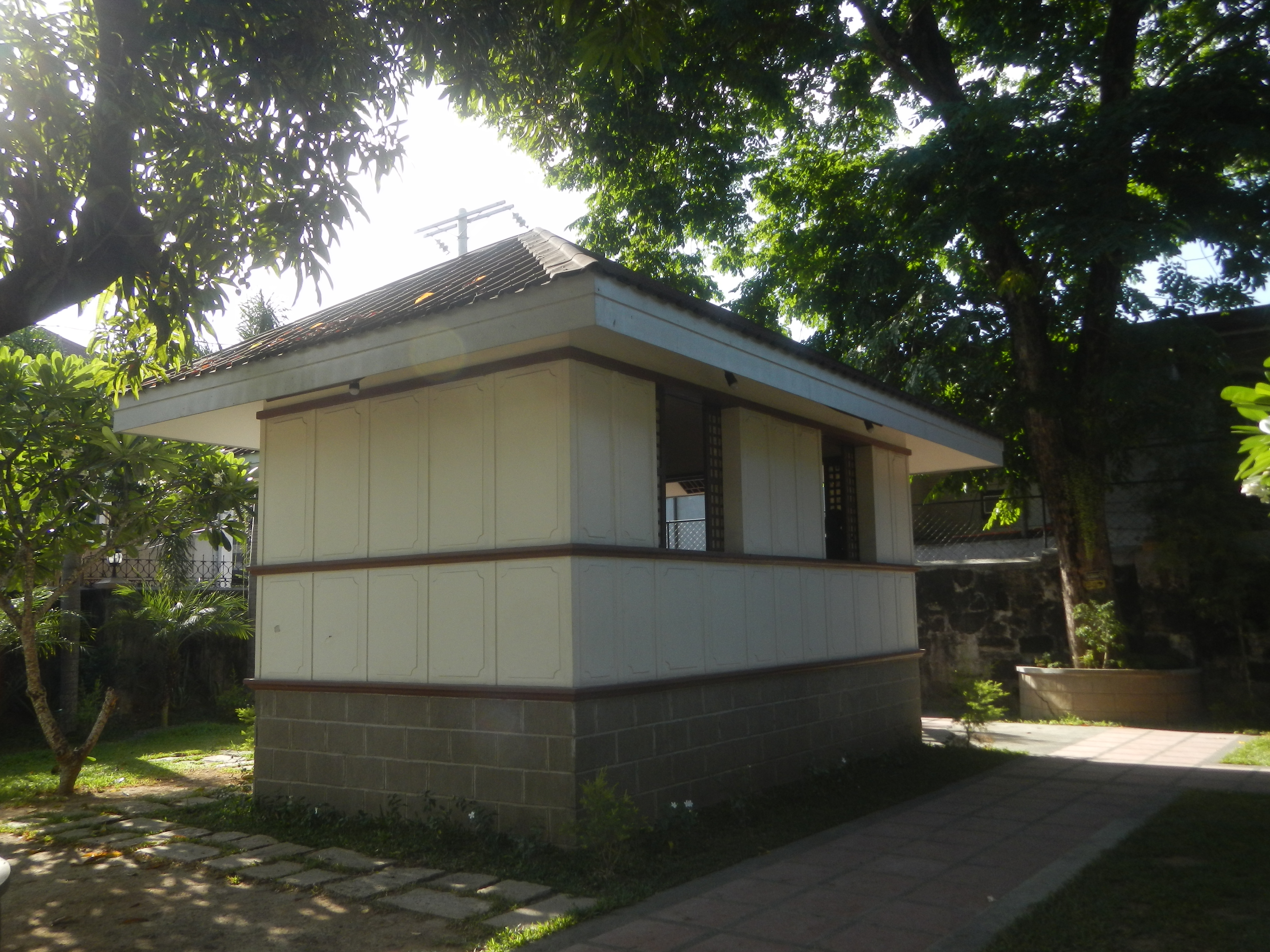
- Rizal's school
- Established: 2016
- Location: Biñan, Laguna
- Coordinates: 14°20′12″N 121°05′01″E
- Type: Museum

The School of Dr. Jose P. Rizal Site and Museum is a museum located in Binan, Laguna, Philippines. It is also the site where Jose Rizal, the national hero of the Philippines, received his first formal education.

== History ==
The School of Dr. Jose P. Rizal Site and Museum showcases the early life of Rizal as a student. It was opened in 2016 and renovated in 2021.

The museum also hosts a historical marker that the Philippines Historical Committee, now the National Historical Commission of the Philippines, was installed on the site in 1948. The marker denotes the location where Rizal received his formal education under Justiniano Cruz, who was also the teacher of his brother Paciano. The school was a small hut, which also served as Cruz's house.

For a year and a half, Rizal learned Spanish, Latin, painting, and other classes. After attending school in 1871, Rizal continued his secondary education at the Ateneo de Manila University.

== Gallery ==
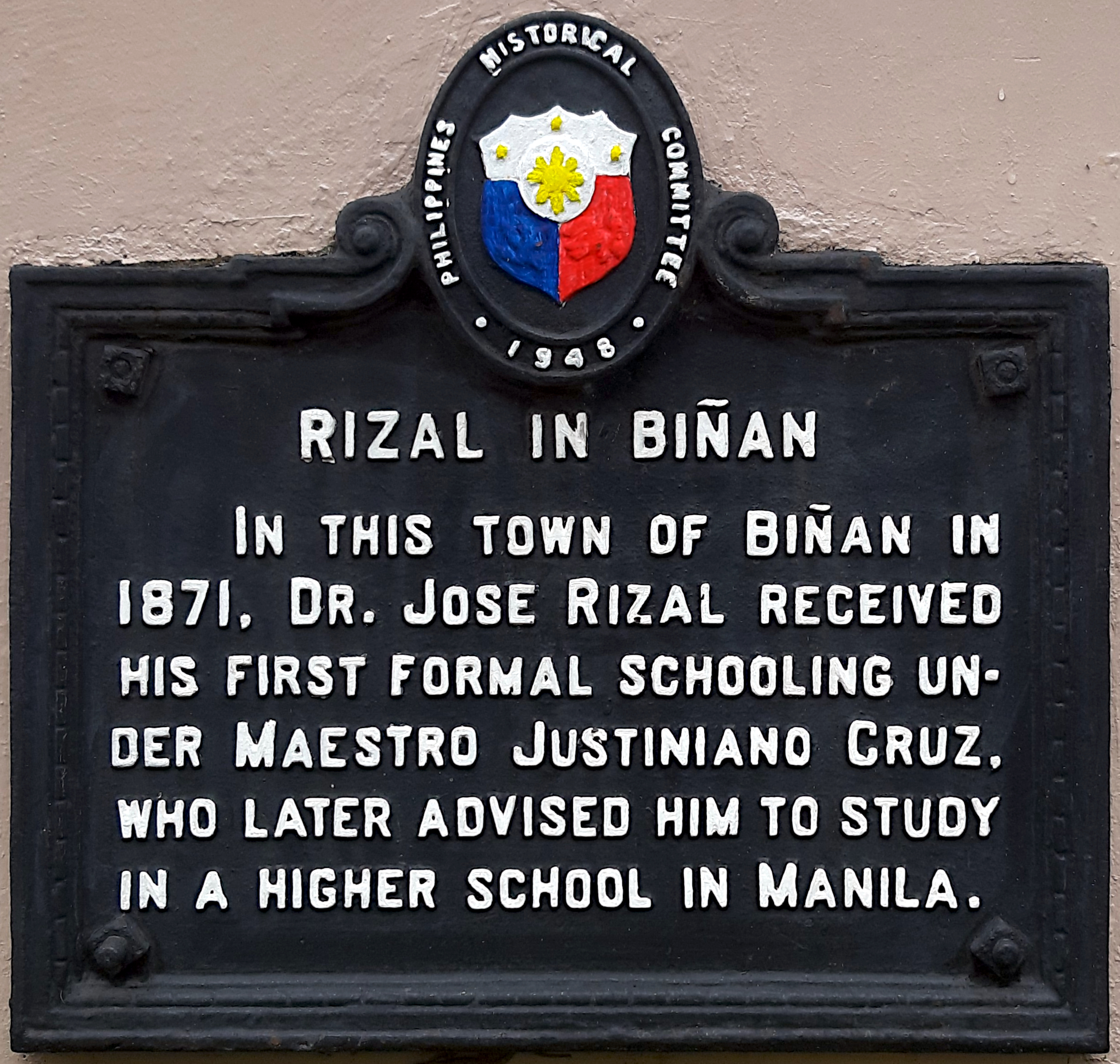
PHC marker

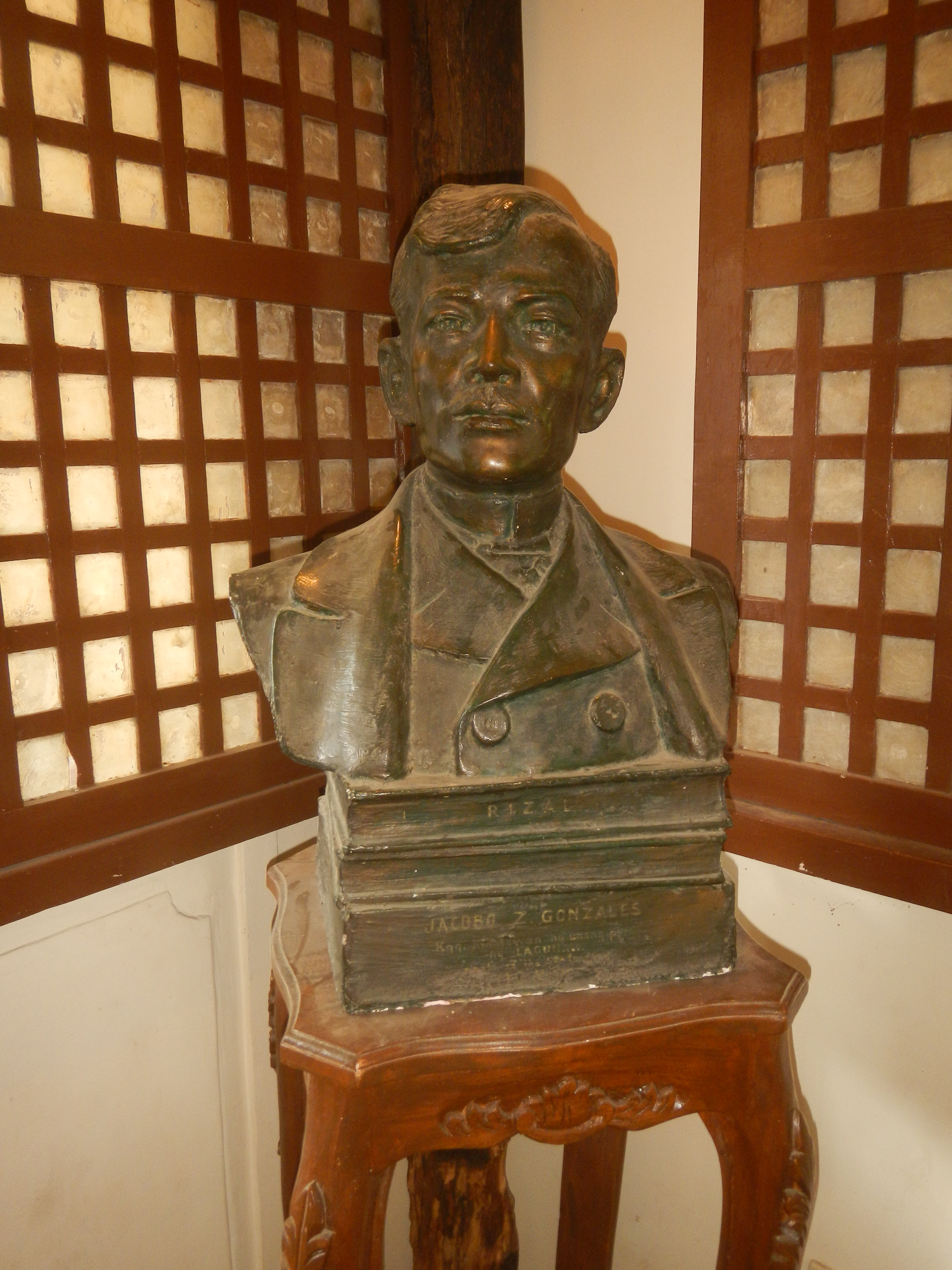
Rizal's bust

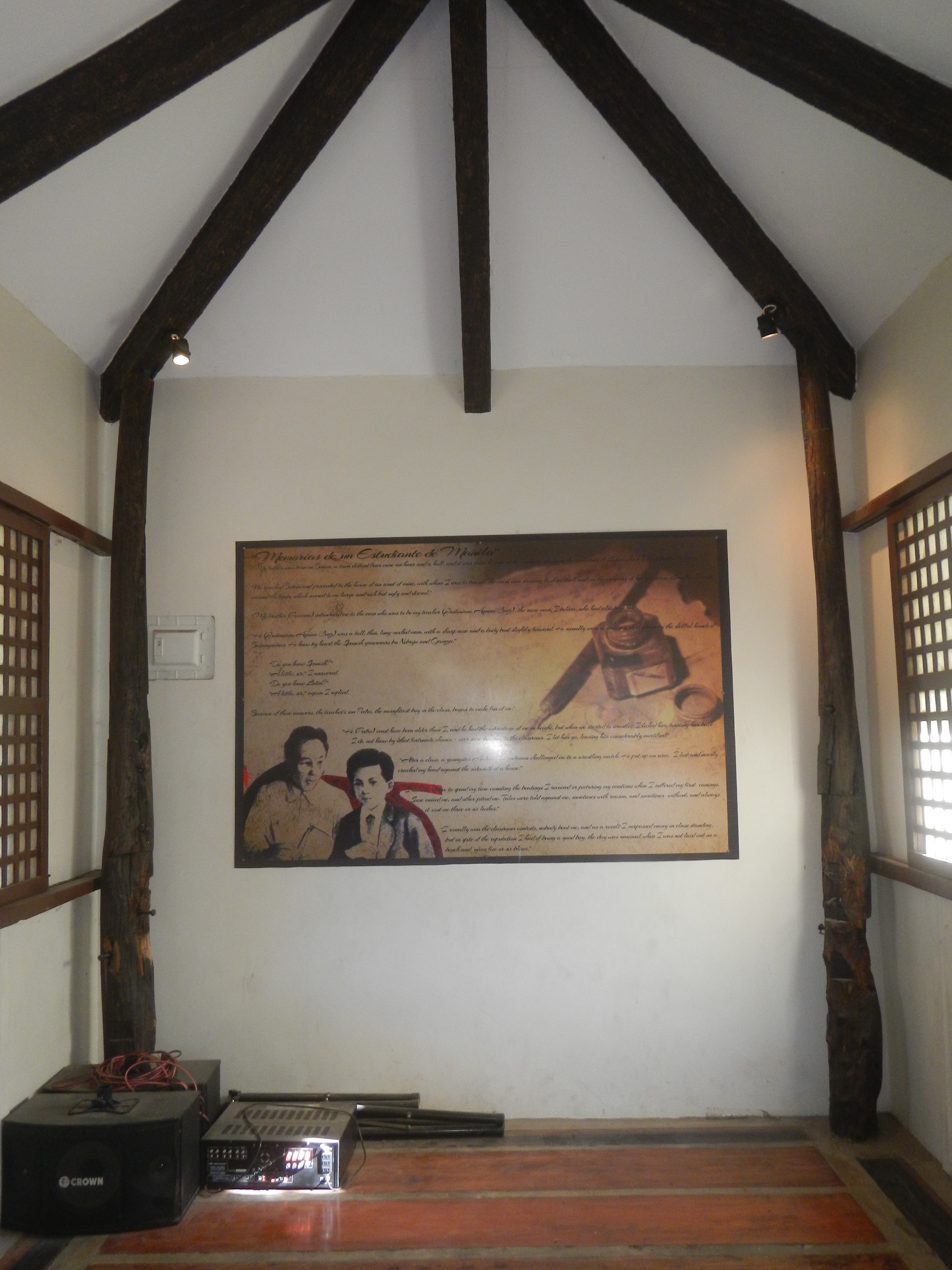
Exhibition panel

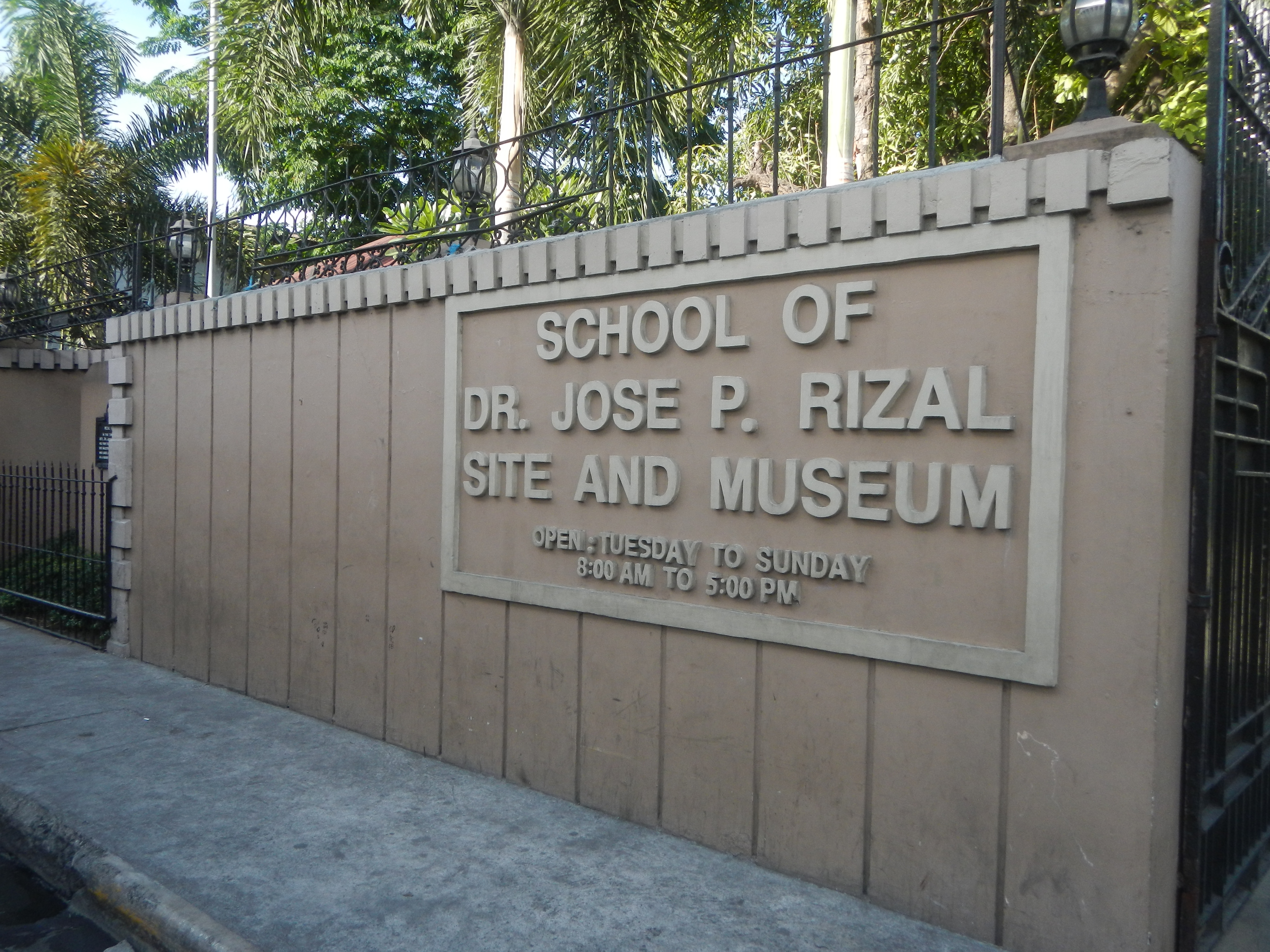
Wall sign
