= Caritas Don Bosco School =

Roman Catholic school in Laguna, Philippines

Location
- Laguna Boulevard, Laguna Technopark; Biñan, Laguna; Philippines; 14°15′30″N 121°03′19″E

Information
- Type: Coeducational, Salesian Family, Catholic
- Motto: "I Love, Therefore, I Serve."
- Established: 1994
- Founder: Caritas Sisters of Jesus
- Oversight: Suore della Carita di Gesu (SCG)
- Principal: Carol Roa
- Grades: K to 12
- Campus: Urban, ~4 hectares
- Colors: Blue, white, and gray
- Affiliations: DBAA; LSMS; PSAAB; DBEC
- Hymn: Caritas Don Bosco Hymn
- Varsity Team: Don Bosco Greywolves
- Website: cdbs.edu.ph

The Caritas Don Bosco School (CDBS, Don Bosco- Caritas,（カリタス ドン・ボスコ スクール）; Filipino: Paaralan ng Caritas Don Bosco) is a private Catholic co-education institution located in Biñan, Laguna, Philippines. It is overseen by the congregation of Suore della Carità di Gesù (SCG) Caritas Sisters of Jesus from Japan.

== History ==
The congregation of the Suore della Carità di Gesù (Caritas Sisters of Jesus) was founded by Italian priests belonging to the Salesians of Don Bosco in 1937 in Miyazaki, Japan.

== Departments and Offerings ==
=== Grade School Department ===
The Grade School Department is the largest department of the school in terms of student population. It consists of pre-school to Grade 6 pupils. The St. Joseph's Building houses the elementary classrooms. It is a three-story building designed with ramps to provide easy access from students going up and going down the floors. It also houses the Pre Kinder and Kinder classrooms just below the senior high school department, inside the Fr. Cavoli building.

=== Junior High School Department ===
The Sacred Heart of Jesus Building houses the High School Department. It consists of two floors and ramps are also present for easy access. The following are the subject areas that form part of the high school curriculum:

- English
- Araling Panlipunan (AP)
- Christian Living and Values Educations (CLVE)
- Filipino
- Math
- Music
- Drafting
- TLE / Robotics
- Information Technology
- Music, Arts, Physical Education, Health (MAPEH)
- Integrated Science

=== Senior High School Department ===
The Senior High School Department is housed in the latest building of the school aptly named Fr. Cavoli building whose namesake is the founder of the SCG sisters. To enhance the K-12 curriculum, it offers a selection of career-enlightening elective classes such as Robotics, Programming for Software Development, Healthcare: Introduction to Nursing, Physical Therapy, and Dentistry, AutoCad: Basic and Advanced, Local and International Film Studies, Mythology, Linguistics, and Automotive Mechanics, among others.

It currently offers the following strands from the Academic Track:

- Accounting, Business, and Management (ABM)
- Humanities and Social Sciences (HUMSS)
- Science, Technology, Engineering, and Mathematics (STEM) with a choice of being part of the Allied Health/Medicine sub-strand or the Architecture/Engineering sub-strand.

== Athletics ==
Caritas Don Bosco School is part of the Don Bosco Athletic Association (DBAA), wherein its other members are the different Don Bosco Schools in the Philippines. Its mascot is Grigio the Greywolf, hence, called Caritas Greywolves or Don Bosco Greywolves. They offer basketball, football/futsal, volleyball, badminton and fencing.

== Chapel ==
Caritas Don Bosco School houses a boat-shaped chapel called the Stella Maris Chapel, a two-storey chapel inspired by Noah's Ark.
