= Veneto =

Region of Italy

Veneto Vèneto (Venetian) Venetia
- Region
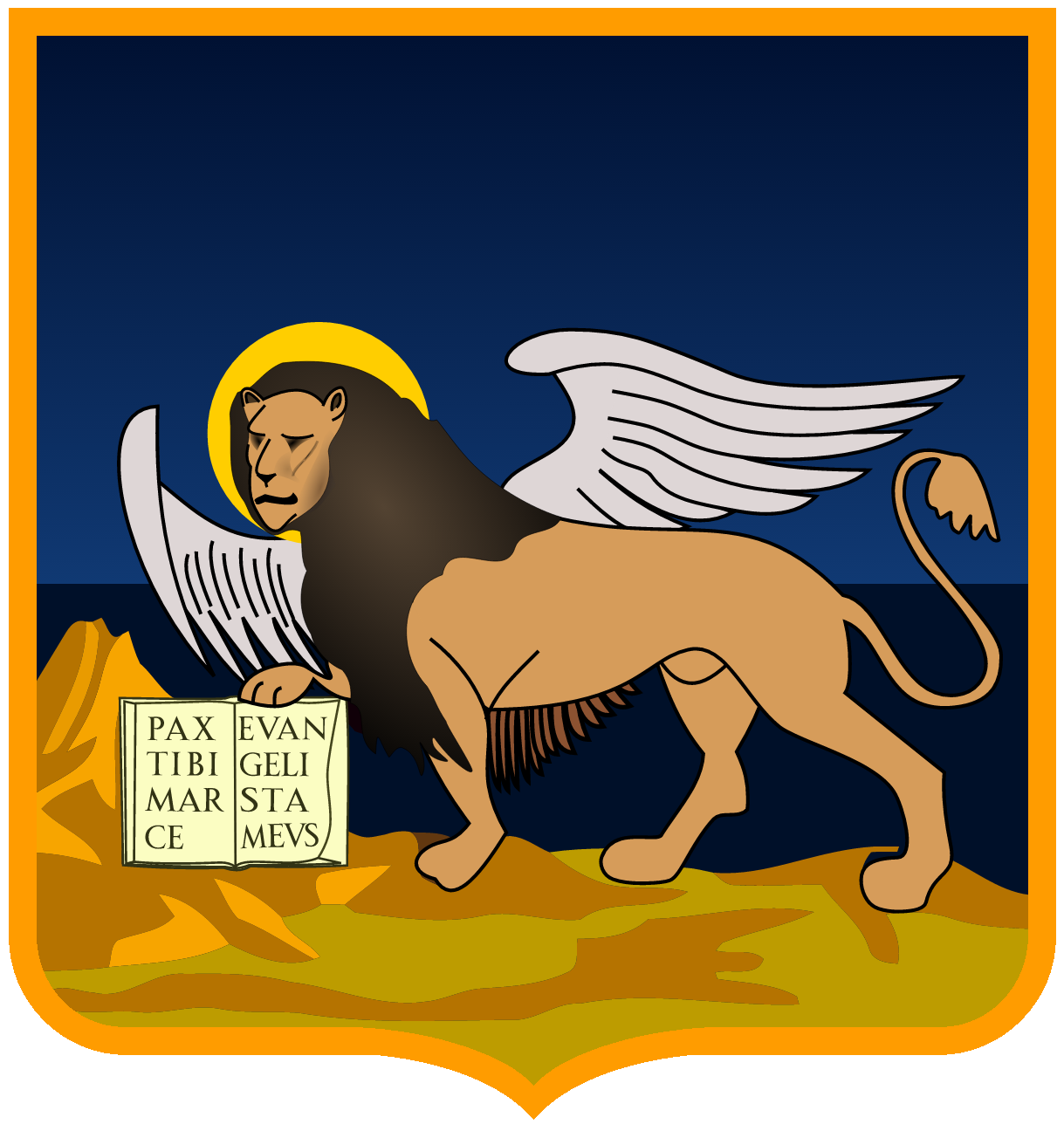
- Flag Coat of arms

- Coordinates: 45°44′00″N 11°51′00″E
- Country: Italy
- Capital: Venice
- Largest city: Verona

Government
  - Type: Presidential system
  - Body: Regional Government
  - President: Alberto Stefani (LV–Lega)
  - Legislature: Regional Council

Area
  - Total: 18,345.36 km^{2} (7,083.18 sq mi)

Population (2026)
  - Total: 4,857,460
  - Rank: 4th in Italy
  - Density: 264.779/km^{2} (685.774/sq mi)
- Demonym(s): English: Venetian; Italian: veneto (masculine), veneta (feminine)

Languages
  - Official: Italian
  - Partially recognised: Venetian
  - Minority languages: Cimbrian, Ladin, Friulian (recognised) Emilian (Ferrarese dialect) (other)

GDP
  - Total: €201.246 billion (2024)
  - Per capita: €41,468 (2024)
- Time zone: UTC+1 (CET)
  - Summer (DST): UTC+2 (CEST)
- ISO 3166 code: IT-34
- HDI (2022): 0.914 very high · 9th of 21
- NUTS Region: ITD
- Website: www.regione.veneto.it

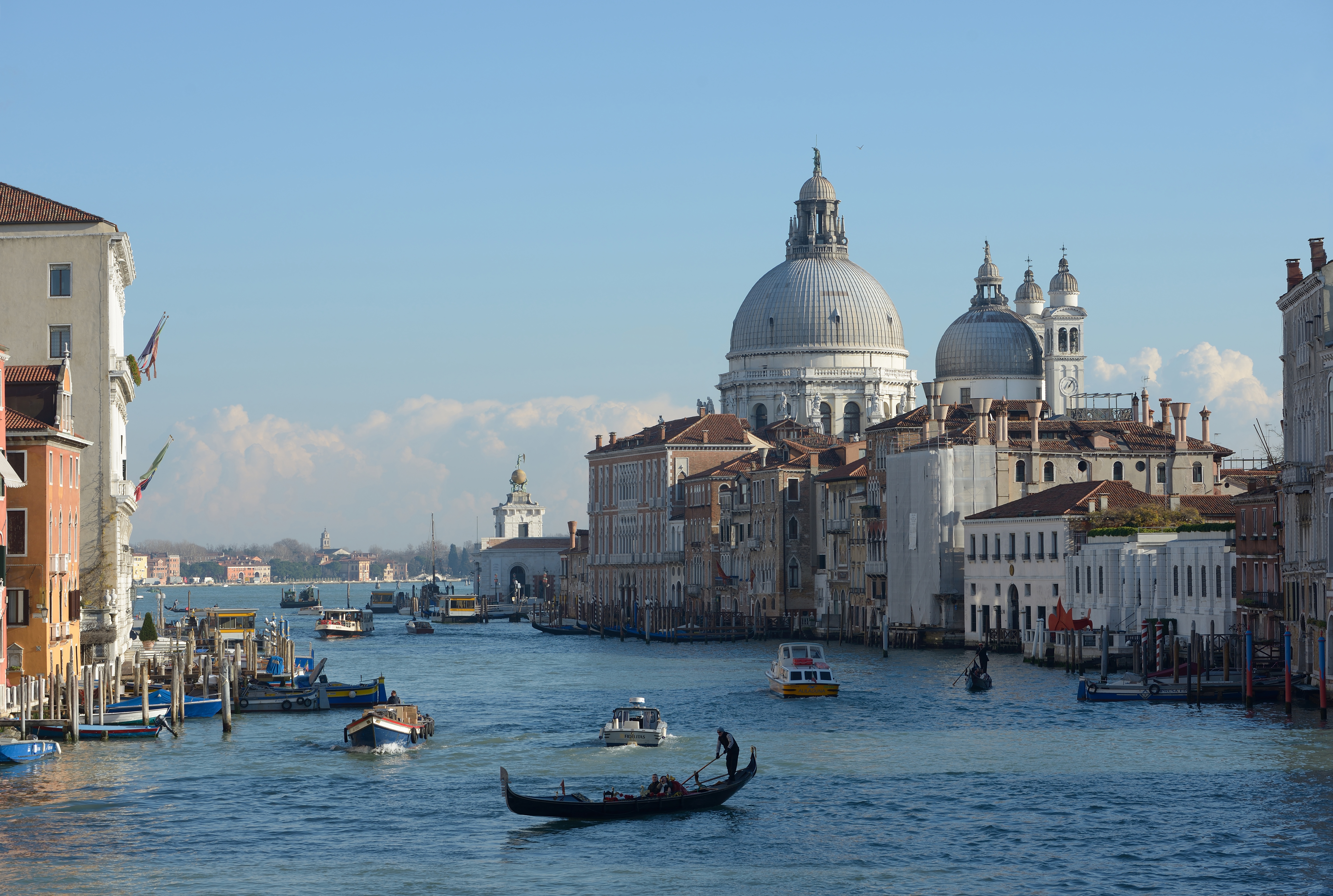
The city of Venice, ranked many times as the most beautiful city in the world. It is the primary tourist destination and the capital of Veneto.

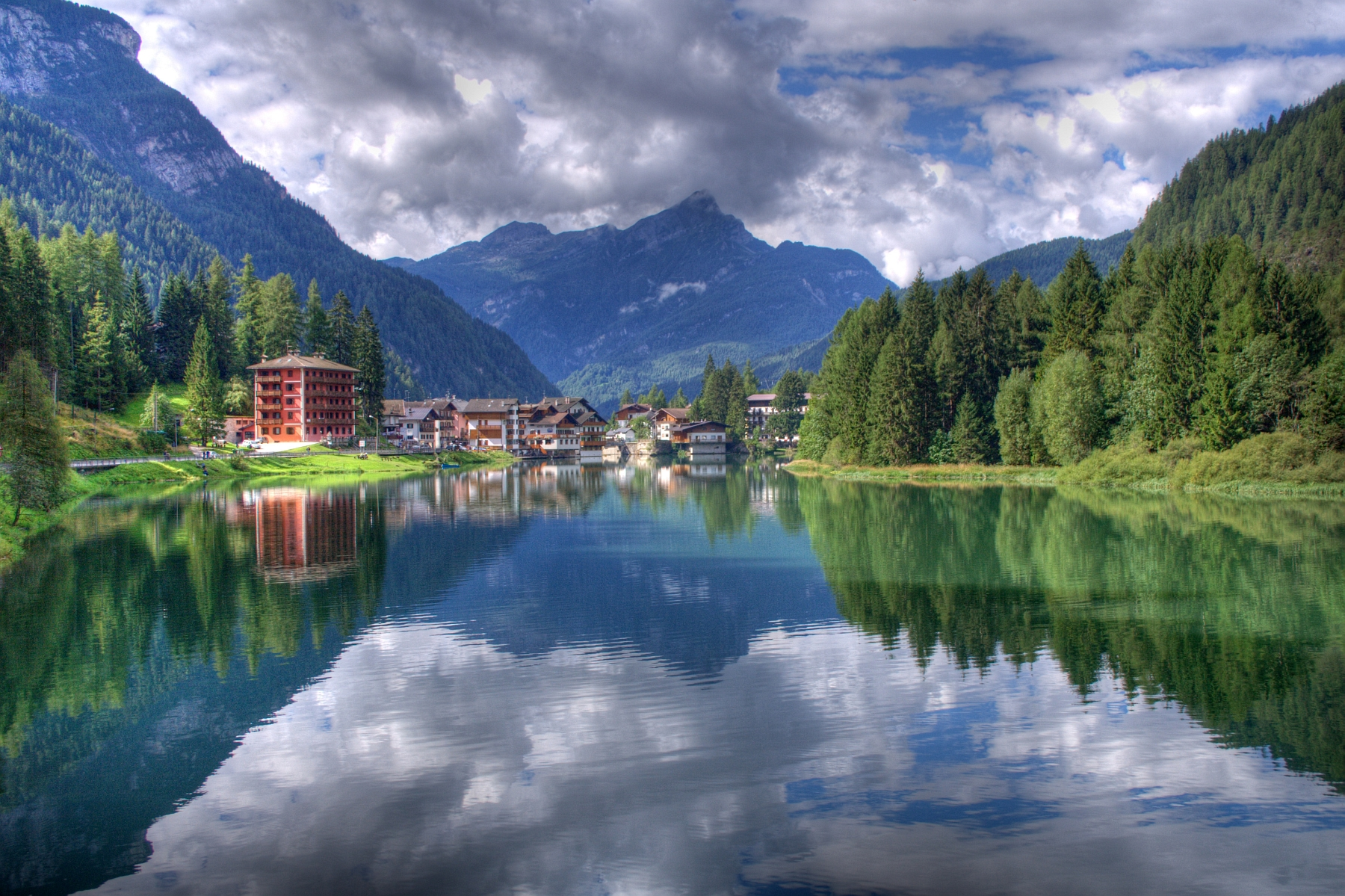
Lake Alleghe near Belluno

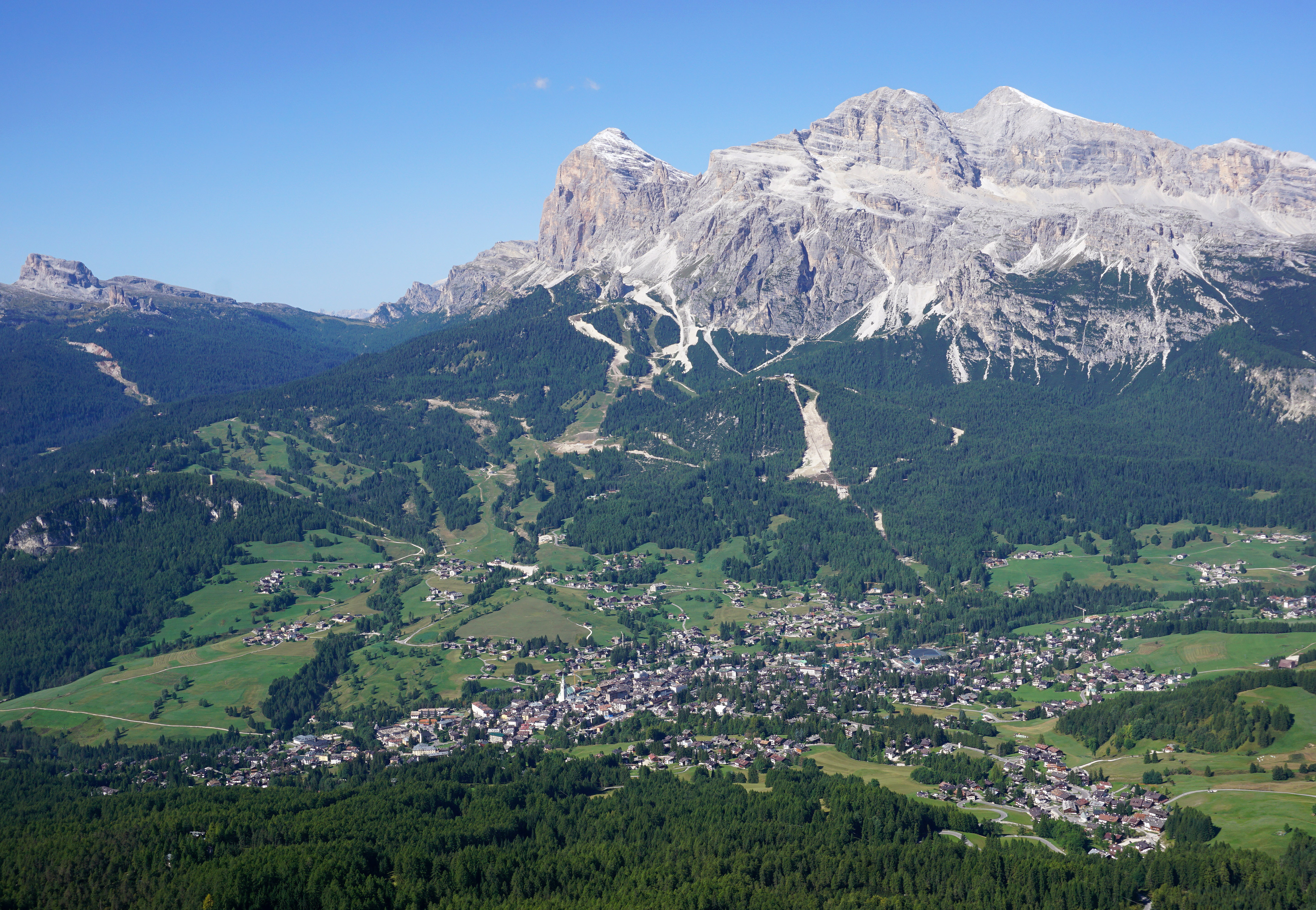
Cortina d'Ampezzo

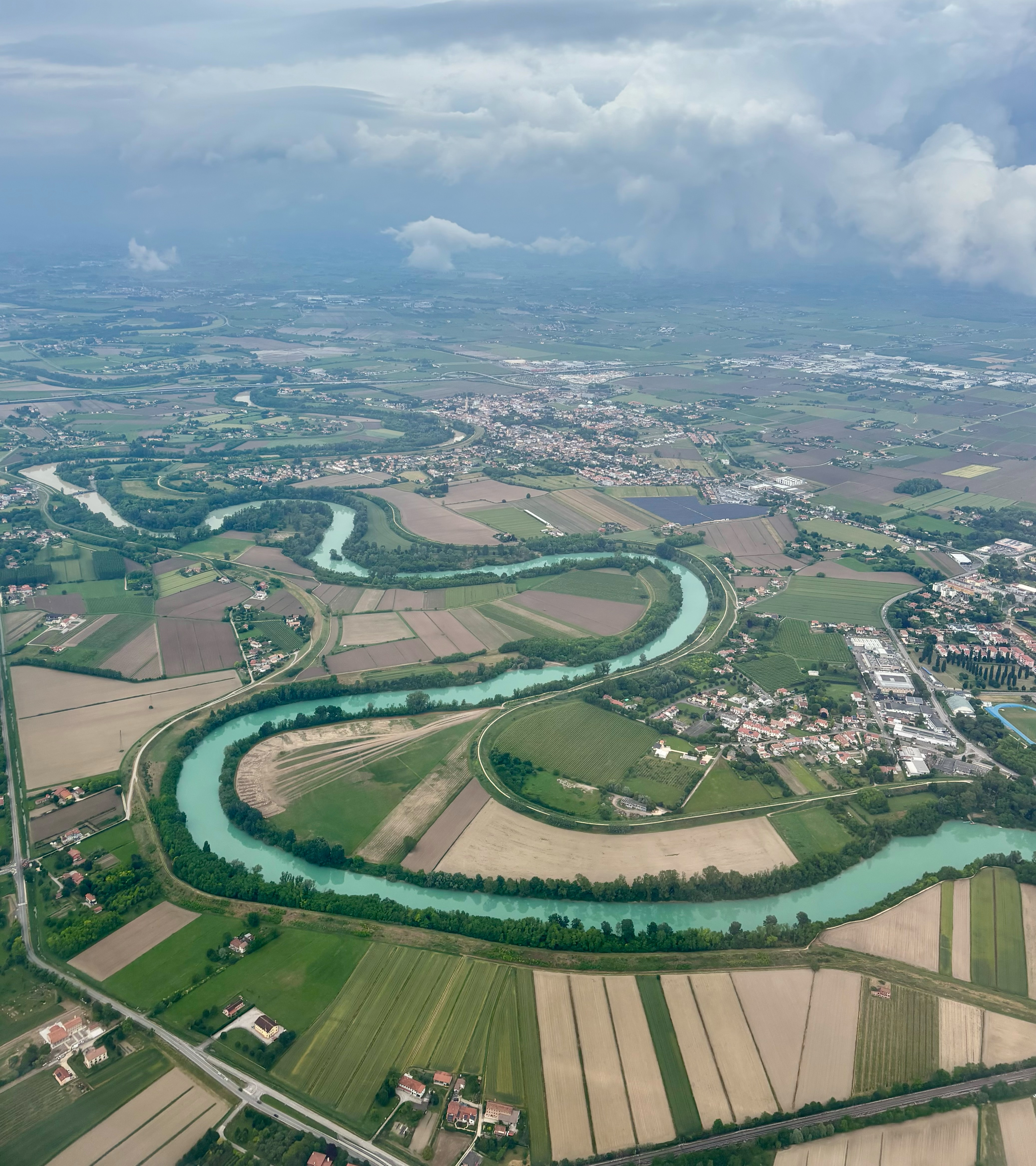
The Piave River

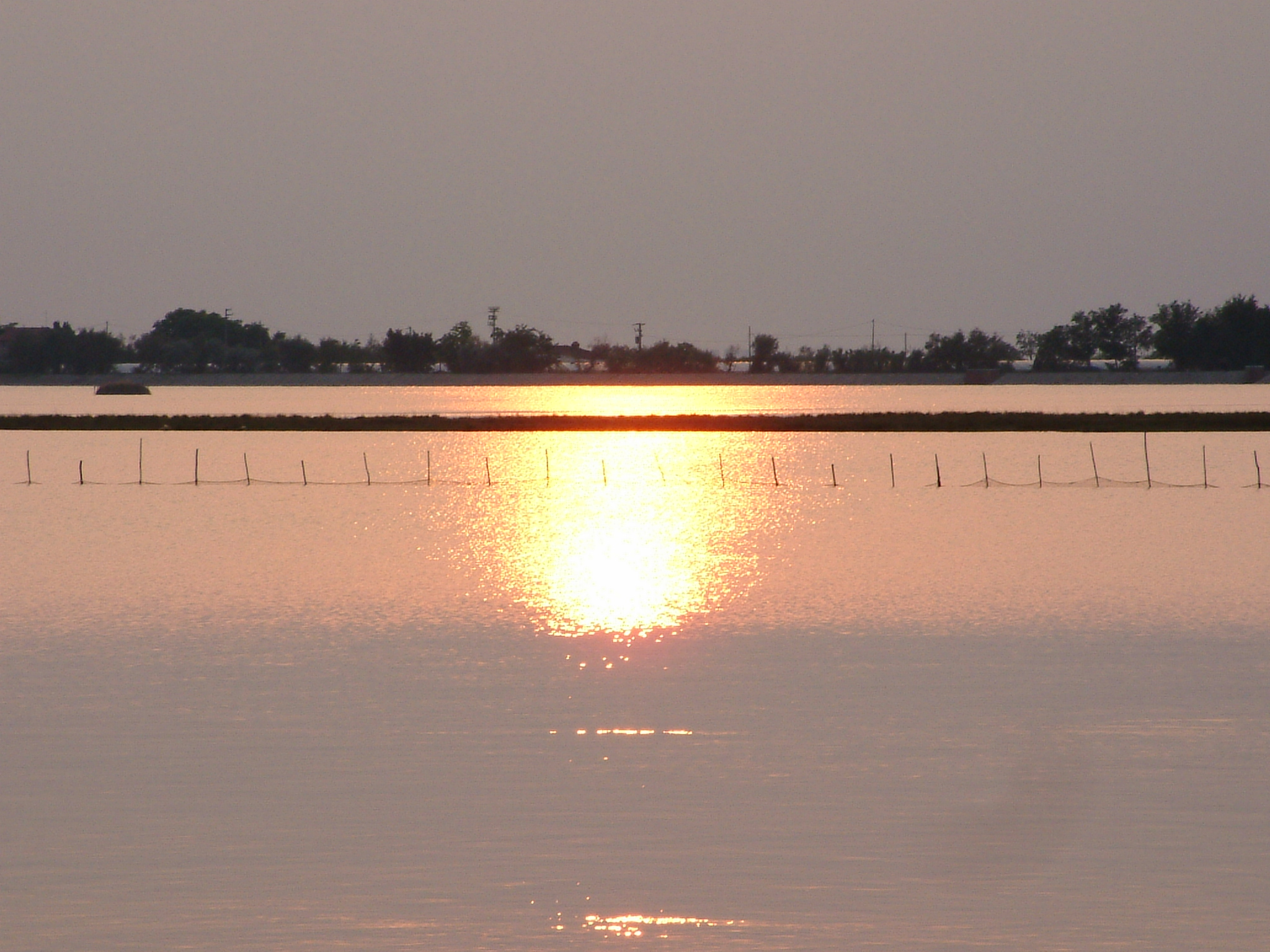
The Venetian Lagoon at sunset

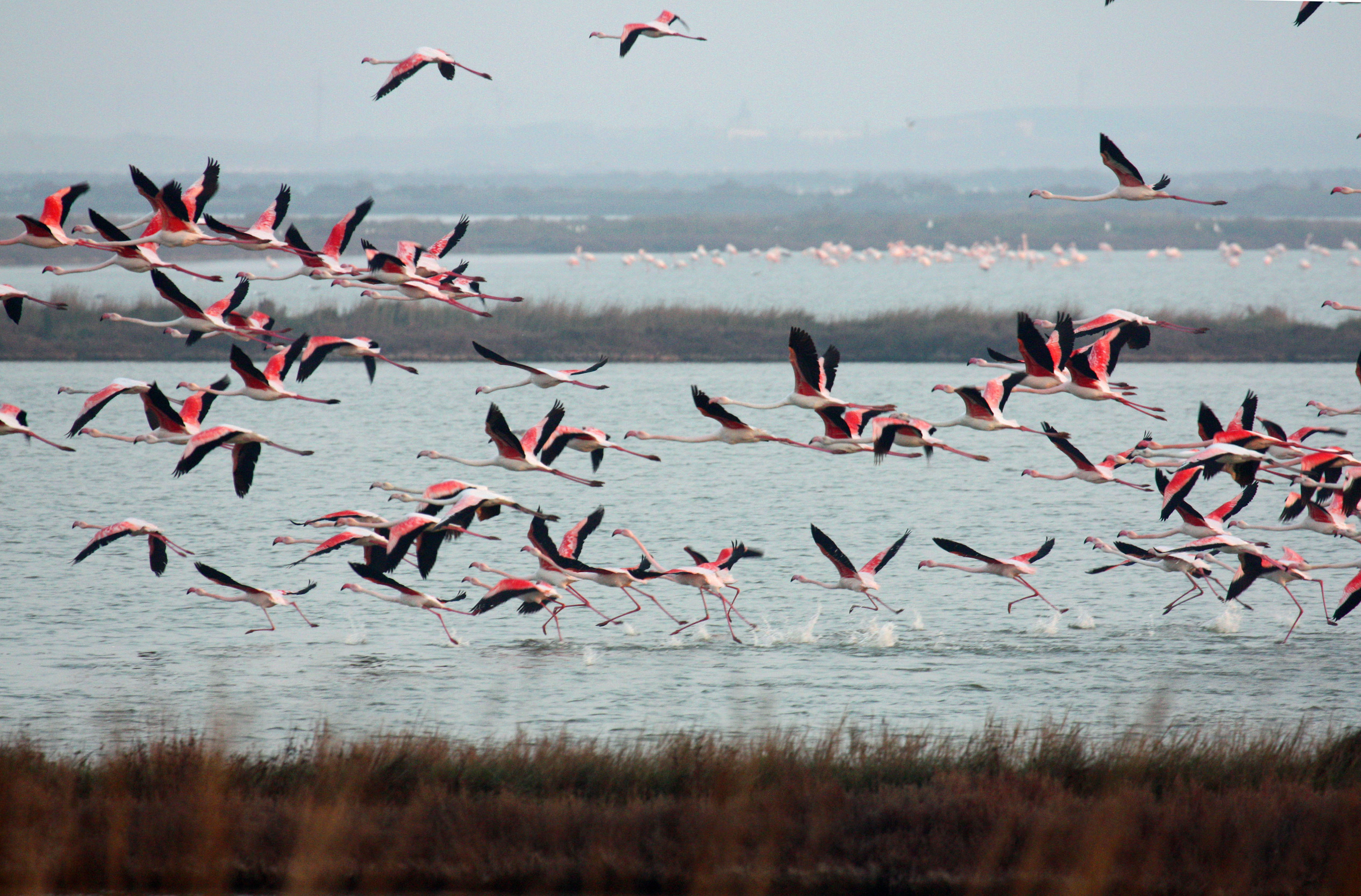
Flamingos in the delta of the Po river

Veneto, (Note: /ˈvɛnətoʊ, ˈveɪn-/, VEN-ə-toh, VAYN-; Italian: [ˈvɛːneto]; Venetian: Vèneto, [ˈvɛneto]; Ladin: Unieja; Austrian German: Venezien; also called the Venetia in English) officially the Region of Veneto, (Note: Italian: Regione del Veneto, lit. 'region of the Veneto') is one of the 20 regions of Italy, located in the north-east of the country. It is the 4th most populous region in Italy, with a population of 4,857,460 as of 2026. Venice is the region's capital while Verona is the largest city.

Veneto was part of the Roman Empire until the 5th century AD. Later, after a feudal period, it was part of the Republic of Venice until 1797. Venice ruled for centuries over one of the largest and richest maritime republics and trade empires in the world. After the Napoleonic Wars and the Congress of Vienna, the former Republic was combined with Lombardy and re-annexed to the Austrian Empire as the Kingdom of Lombardy–Venetia, until that was merged with the Kingdom of Italy in 1866, as a result of the Third Italian War of Independence and of a plebiscite.

Besides Italian, most inhabitants also speak Venetian. Since 1971, the Statute of Veneto has referred to the region's citizens as "the Venetian people". Article 1 defines Veneto as an "autonomous Region", "constituted by the Venetian people and the lands of the provinces of Belluno, Padua, Rovigo, Treviso, Venice, Verona, and Vicenza", while maintaining "bonds with Venetians in the world". Article 2 sets forth the principle of the "self-government of the Venetian people" and mandates the Region to "promote the historical identity of the Venetian people and civilisation". Despite these affirmations, approved by the Italian Parliament, Veneto is not among the autonomous regions with special statute, unlike its north-eastern and north-western neighbours, Friuli-Venezia Giulia and Trentino-Alto Adige/Südtirol respectively.

Veneto is home to a notable nationalist movement, known as Venetian nationalism or Venetism. The region's largest party is Liga Veneta, a founding component of Lega Nord. The current President of Veneto is Alberto Stefani (Liga Veneta–Lega Nord), elected in 2025. An autonomy referendum took place in 2017: 57.2% of Venetians turned out, 98.1% voting "yes" to "further forms and special conditions of autonomy".

Having been for a long period in history a land of mass emigration, Veneto is today one of the greatest immigrant-receiving regions in the country, with foreign-born residents making up 13.9% of the population, the 7th-largest share among all regions.

== History ==
=== Venetic period ===
Between the 2nd and 1st millennium BC, the region was inhabited by the Euganei. According to ancient historians, who perhaps wanted to link Venetic origins to legend of Roman origins in Troy, the Veneti (often called the Palaeoveneti) came from Paphlagonia in Anatolia at the time of the Fall of Troy (12th century BC), led by prince Antenor, a comrade of Aeneas. Other historians link Venetic origins with Celts.

In the 7th–6th centuries BC the local populations of Veneto entered into contact with the Etruscans and the Greeks. Venetic culture reached a high point during the 4th century BC. These ancient Veneti spoke Venetic, an Indo-European language akin to, but distinct from Latin and the other Italic languages. Meanwhile, the Veneti prospered through their trade in amber and breeding of horses. Este, Padua, Oderzo, Adria, Vicenza, Verona, and Altino became centres of Venetic culture. Over time, the Veneti began to adopt the dress and certain other customs of their Celtic neighbours.

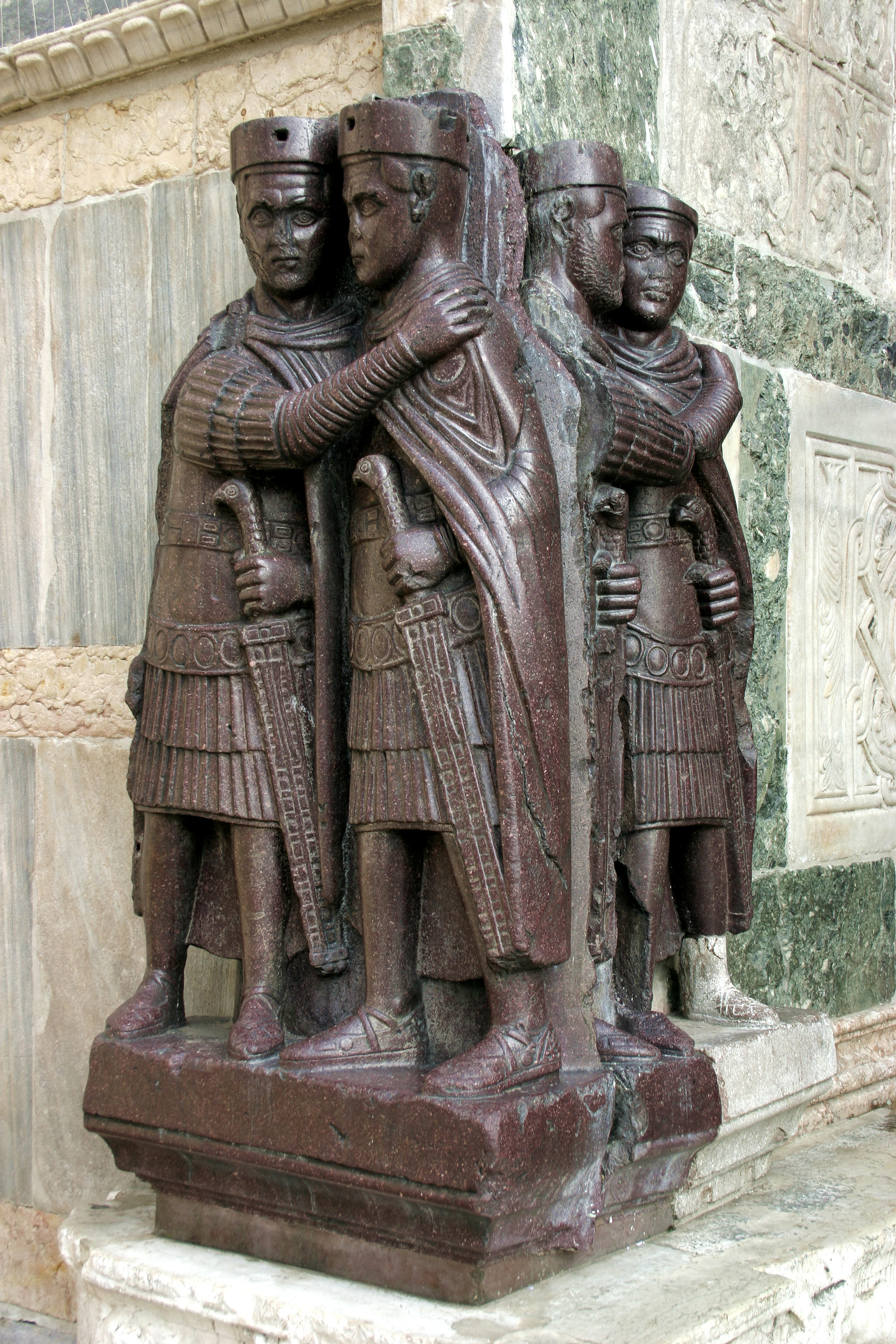
The Tetrarchs were the four co-rulers who governed the Roman Empire as long as Diocletian's reform lasted. Here they are portrayed embracing, in a posture of harmony, in a porphyry sculpture dating from the 4th century, produced in Anatolia, located today on a corner of St Mark's Basilica in Venice.

=== Roman period ===
During the 3rd century BC, the Veneti, together with the Cenomani Celts on their western border, sided with the Romans, as Rome expanded and struggled against the Insubres and Boii (Celts). During the Second Punic War (218 – 202 BC), the Veneti even sent a contingent of soldiers to fight alongside the Romans against Hannibal and the invading Carthaginians. These Venetians were among those slaughtered at the Battle of Cannae (216 BC).

In 181 BC a Roman triumvirate of Publius Cornelius Scipio Nasica, Caius Flaminius, and Lucius Manlius Acidinus founded a Latin colony at Aquileia as a base to protect the territory of the Veneti from incursions of the hostile Carni and Histri. From then on, Roman influence over the area increased. In 169 BC 1,500 more colonising families were sent by Rome to Aquileia. In 148 BC the Via Postumia was completed connecting Aquileia to Genoa. In 131 BC, the Via Annia joined Adria to Patavium (modern Padua) to Altinum to Concordia to Aquileia.

The Roman Republic gradually transformed its alliance with the Veneti into a relationship of dominance. After the 91 BC Italic rebellion, the cities of the Veneti, together with the rest of Transpadania, were granted partial rights of Roman citizenship according to the Lex Pompeia de Transpadanis. Later in 49 BC, by the Lex Roscia granted full Roman citizenship to the Veneti. The Via Claudia would be completed in AD 46 to connected Altinum, Tarvisium (modern Treviso), Feltria (modern Feltre), and Tridentum (modern Trento). From Tridentum it continued northwards to Pons Drusus and further to Augusta Vindelicorum (modern Augsburg), and southwards from Trento to Verona and Mutina (modern Modena).

After the Battle of Philippi (42 BC) ended the Roman Civil War, the lands of the Veneti, together with the rest of Cisalpine Gaul, ceased to be a province. Between 8 and 6 BC, Augustus reorganized Italia into 11 regions. The territory of modern Veneto along with Istria, modern Friuli and Trentino-Alto Adige and eastern Lombardy (including its cities of Mantua, Cremona, Brescia, and Sondrio) became Region X (Venetia et Histria). Aquileia, although not officially the capital was the chief municipium of the region. Meanwhile, under the Pax Romana, Patavium developed into one of the most important cities of northern Italy. Other Venetic cities such as Opitergium (modern Oderzo), Tarvisium, Feltria, Vicetia (modern Vicenza), Ateste (modern Este), and Altinum (modern Altino) adopted the Latin language and the culture of Rome. By the end of the 1st century AD Latin had displaced the original Venetic language.

In 166 AD the Quadi and Marcomanni invaded Venetia. It was the beginning of many barbarian invasions. Marcus Aurelius retaining the regions of Italia, superimposed another layer of administration by ascribing Regions X and XI to the district of Transpadana under a iuridicus. The end of the 3rd c. brought further administrative changes when Diocletian abolished the regions and districts and established provinciae. Thus, Region X (Venetia et Histria) became Province VIII (Venetia et Histria), being enlarged in the west up to the Adda River governed by a corrector until 363 and from 368 to 373 by a consularius seated at Aquileia. Venetia et Histria remained one of the 16 Provinces of Italy in the 5th century when both Alaric the Goth and then Attila and the Huns devastated the area. Attila laid siege to Aquileia and turned it into a ruin in 452 AD. Many of the mainland inhabitants sought protection in the nearby lagoons which would become Grado in the east and Venice more to the west. On the heels of the Huns came the Ostrogoths who not only invaded, but also settled down in the region, especially near Treviso where the penultimate king Totila was born.

During the mid-6th century, Justinian reconquered Venetia for the Eastern Roman Empire. An Exarch was established at Ravenna while a military tribune was set up in Oderzo. Greek-Byzantine rule did not last long. Starting in 568 AD, the Lombards crossed the Julian Alps. These invaders subdivided the territory of Venetia into numerous feuds ruled by Germanic dukes and counts, essentially creating the division of Veneto from Friuli.

The invasion provoked another wave of migration from the mainland to the Byzantine controlled coast and islands. In 643 AD the Lombards conquered the Byzantine base at Oderzo and took possession of practically all of Veneto (and Friuli) except for Venice and Grado. The 36 Lombard duchies included the Venetian cities of Ceneda, Treviso, Verona, and Vicenza. A reminder of Lombard rule can be seen in the place names beginning with the word Farra.

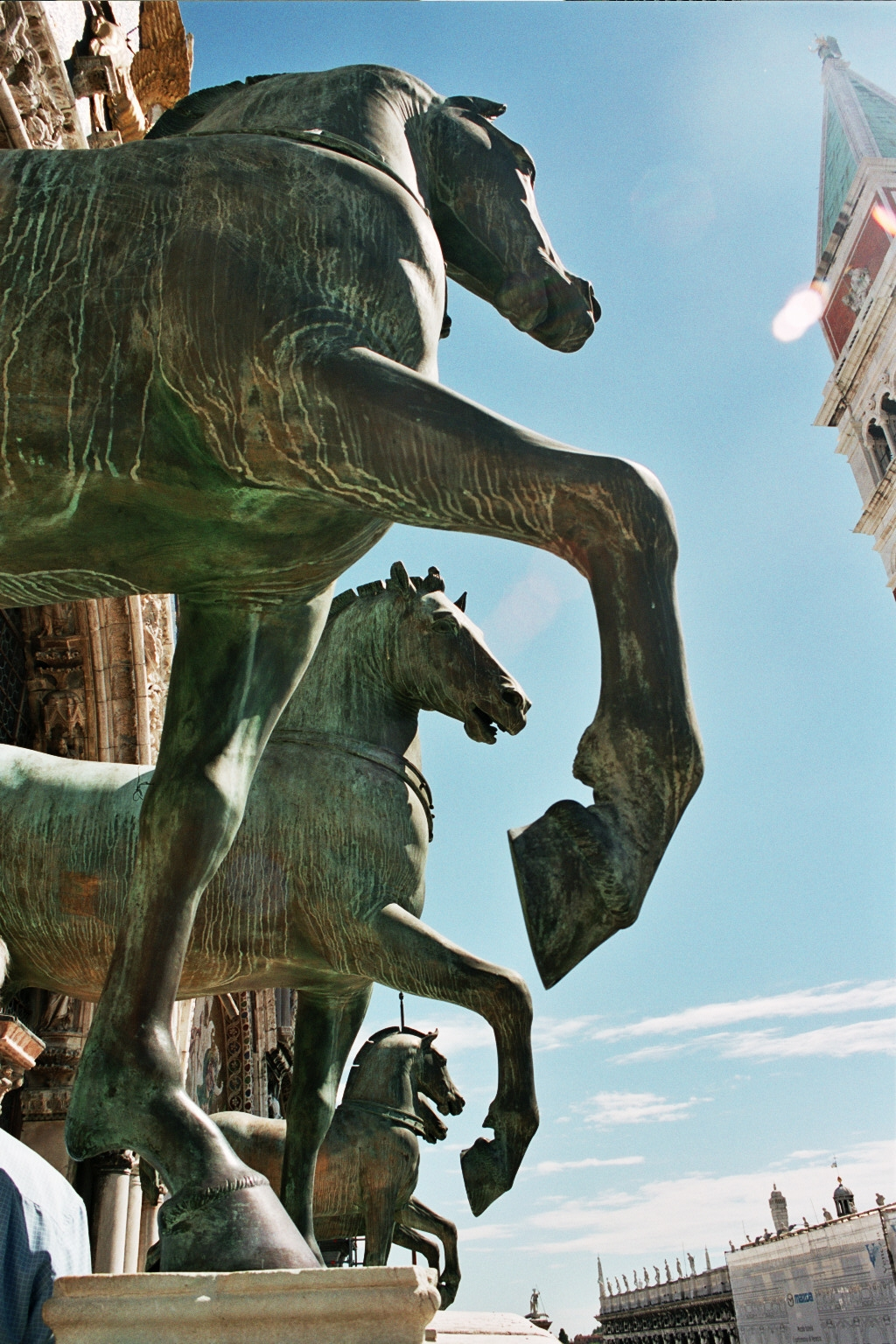
The Horses of Saint Mark, brought as loot from Constantinople in 1204

=== Middle Ages ===
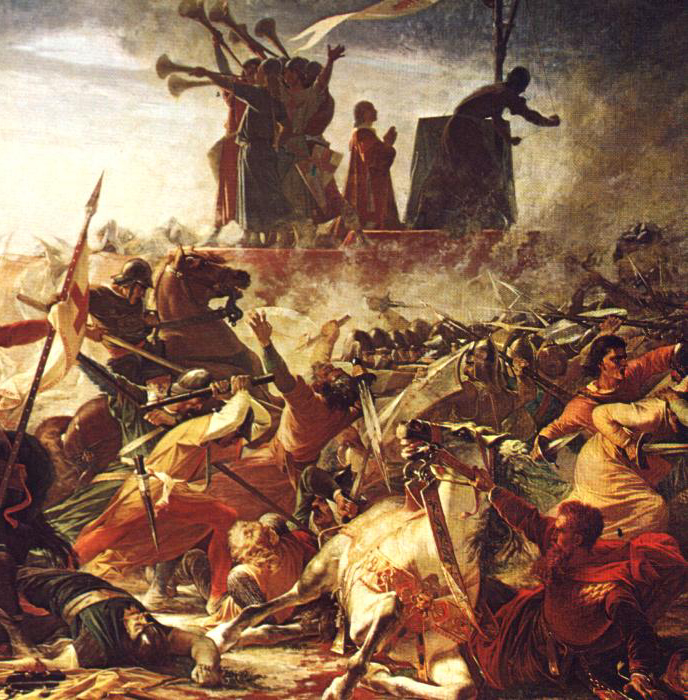
The defence of the Carroccio during the battle of Legnano (1176) by Amos Cassioli (1832–1891)

By the middle of the 8th century, the Franks had assumed political control of the region and the mainland of Veneto became part of the Carolingian Empire. Though politically dominant, these Germanic invaders were gradually absorbed into the Venetian population over the centuries. In the late 9th century, Berengar, Margrave of the March of Friuli was elected king of Italy. Under his tumultuous reign, the March of Friuli was absorbed into the March of Verona so that Verona's territory contained a large portion of Roman Venetia.

In the 10th century, the mainland of Veneto, after suffering raids from the Magyars and the Slavs, was incorporated into the Holy Roman Empire. Gradually, the communes of the mainland grew in power and wealth. In 1167 an alliance (called the Lombard League) was formed among the Venetian cities such as Padua, Treviso, Vicenza, and Verona with other cities of Northern Italy to assert their rights against the Holy Roman Emperor.

The emperor Frederick I, Barbarossa (reigned 1155–1190) conducted six military campaigns in Italy, which was under his Holy Roman Empire. Originally he wanted to confront the Norman Kingdom of Sicily in the south. However, his intervention in Italy was opposed by several Italian cities, particularly Milan, which he had partially destroyed during his second campaign. A dispute with Pope Alexander III (1159–1181) developed because Frederick endorsed antipope Victor IV, who had been elected in opposition to Alexander. Opposition against Frederick in northern Italy grew and the Lombard League, a league formed by several cities, fought him. Frederick was defeated at the Battle of Legnano in 1176. Preliminary peace negotiations took place at Anagni (the Peace of Anagni) in 1176. Negotiations involving all the concerned parties to reach a formal peace treaty took place in Venice where a conference was scheduled for July 1177. The doge Sebastiano Ziani (1172–1178) was to act as an intermediary.

The Second Treaty of Constance in 1183 confirmed the Peace of Venice of 1177 in which the cities agreed to remain part of the Empire as long as their jurisdiction over their own territories was not infringed upon. The league was dissolved at the death of Emperor Frederick II in 1250. This period also witnessed the founding of the second oldest university in Italy, the University of Padua founded in 1222. Around this time, Padua also served as home to St. Anthony, the beloved Saint called simply "il Santo" ("the Saint") by the inhabitants of the town.

=== Venetian Republic ===
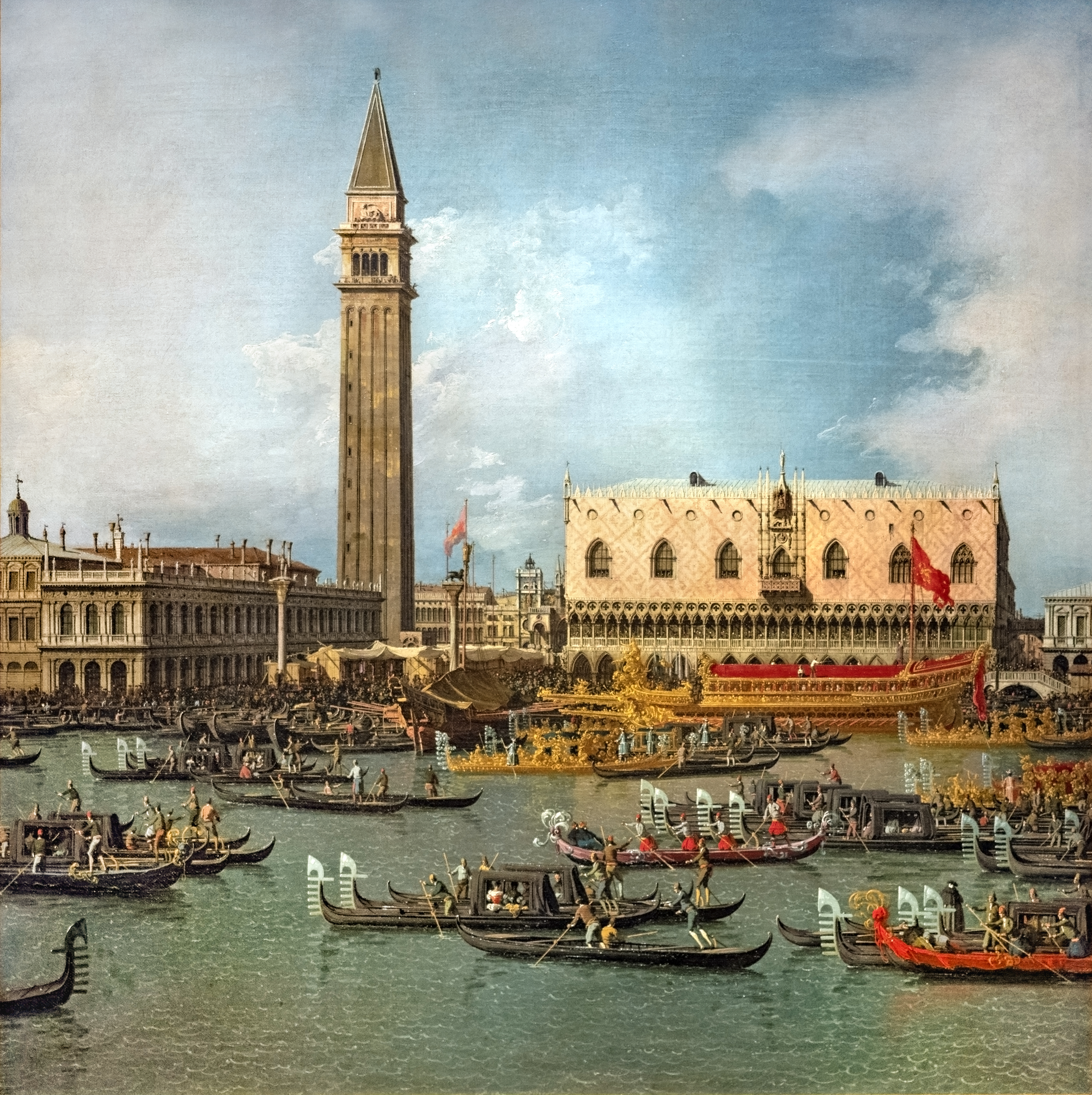
An 18th-century view of Venice by Canaletto

As the barbarians were interested in the wealth of the mainland, part of the Venetian population sought refuge on some of the isolated and unoccupied islands in the lagoon, from which the city of Venetiae or Venice was born. After a period of Byzantine domination in 8th century, Venice became an independent maritime Republic ruled by its elected doge.

The Republic became a commercial superpower and its influence lasted through the Middle Ages and the Renaissance. In fact, the Venetian Republic enjoyed 1100 years of uninterrupted influence throughout the Mediterranean. By the 16th century, the Venetian Republic dominated Veneto, Friuli, parts of Lombardy and Romagna, Istria, Dalmatia, the Ionian Islands of Corfu, Cefalonia, Ithaca and Zante. From the 13th to 17th centuries, it held the island of Crete and from the mid-15th to mid-16th century, the island of Cyprus.

Venetian mainland holdings led to Venetian involvement in European and in particular, Italian politics. Cities had to be fortified, two impressive examples are Nafplio in Peloponnese and Palmanova in Friuli. The wise rule and prosperity brought by the "Serenissima" (most serene republic) made the cities of the terra firma willing subjects. Eastern Islands served as useful ports for Venetian shipping. However, as the Ottoman Empire grew more powerful and aggressive, Venice was often put on the defensive. Ottoman control of the eastern Mediterranean and the discoveries of sea routes to Asia around Africa and of the Americas had a debilitating effect on the Venetian economy.

In 1797, Napoleon invaded the territory of the Venetian Republic. Overwhelmed by more powerful forces, Doge Ludovico Manin resigned and retired to his villa at Passariano in Friuli and the thousand year old Republic disappeared as an independent state. This proved very unpopular in the mainland cities where sympathies were strong with the Republic of Venice. By the Treaty of Campoformio signed on 17 October 1797, part of the Venetian mainland was handed over to Francis II of the Holy Roman Empire and a western part was annexed to the French backed Cisalpine Republic. The territory soon reverted to Napoleon in 1801.

=== Habsburg rule ===
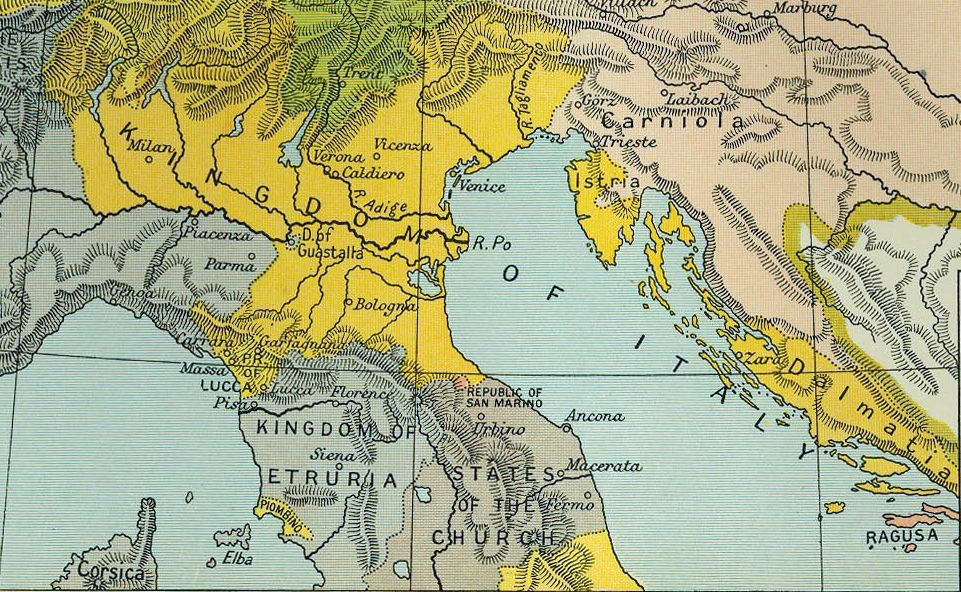
The Napoleonic Kingdom of Italy from 1806 to 1810 included Dalmatia that had belonged to Venice until 1797.

In 1805–1806, Veneto was conquered by Napoleon's armies and included in the Kingdom of Italy. During 1809, the region revolted against the French-Italian rule, supporting the advancing Austrian troops during the War of the Fifth Coalition. It was mainly a peasant revolt, less organised than the nearby Andreas Hofer's revolt, while urban national guard troops fought on the French-Italian side. After the Congress of Vienna, 1814–1815, Venetia was the eastern half of the Kingdom of Lombardy–Venetia, a separate kingdom within the Austrian Empire.

During the 1848 First Italian War of Independence, Venetia rose against the central Austrian government, forming the Republic of San Marco. After 17 months, it sought annexation to the Kingdom of Sardinia, forming an Italian confederation against Austria, and using the Italian tricolour in its flag. However, the other Italian states left the war in May 1848, and Sardinia surrendered (August 1848, then March 1849), Venetia stood alone. It surrendered on 24 August 1849, when the Siege of Venice ended.

The Austrian imperial government was unpopular among upper and middle classes, because of Metternich's anti-liberal politics, turned by Emperor Franz Joseph I into neo-absolutism after 1848, and for not granting Lombardo–Venetia any real autonomy: It was considered less than a puppet state; nevertheless, it was appreciated (especially among lower classes) for its efficient and honest administration; by 1848–1849, there would be no further revolt against the Austrian rule.

=== United Italy ===
The 13th-century Castel Brando in Cison di Valmarino, Treviso

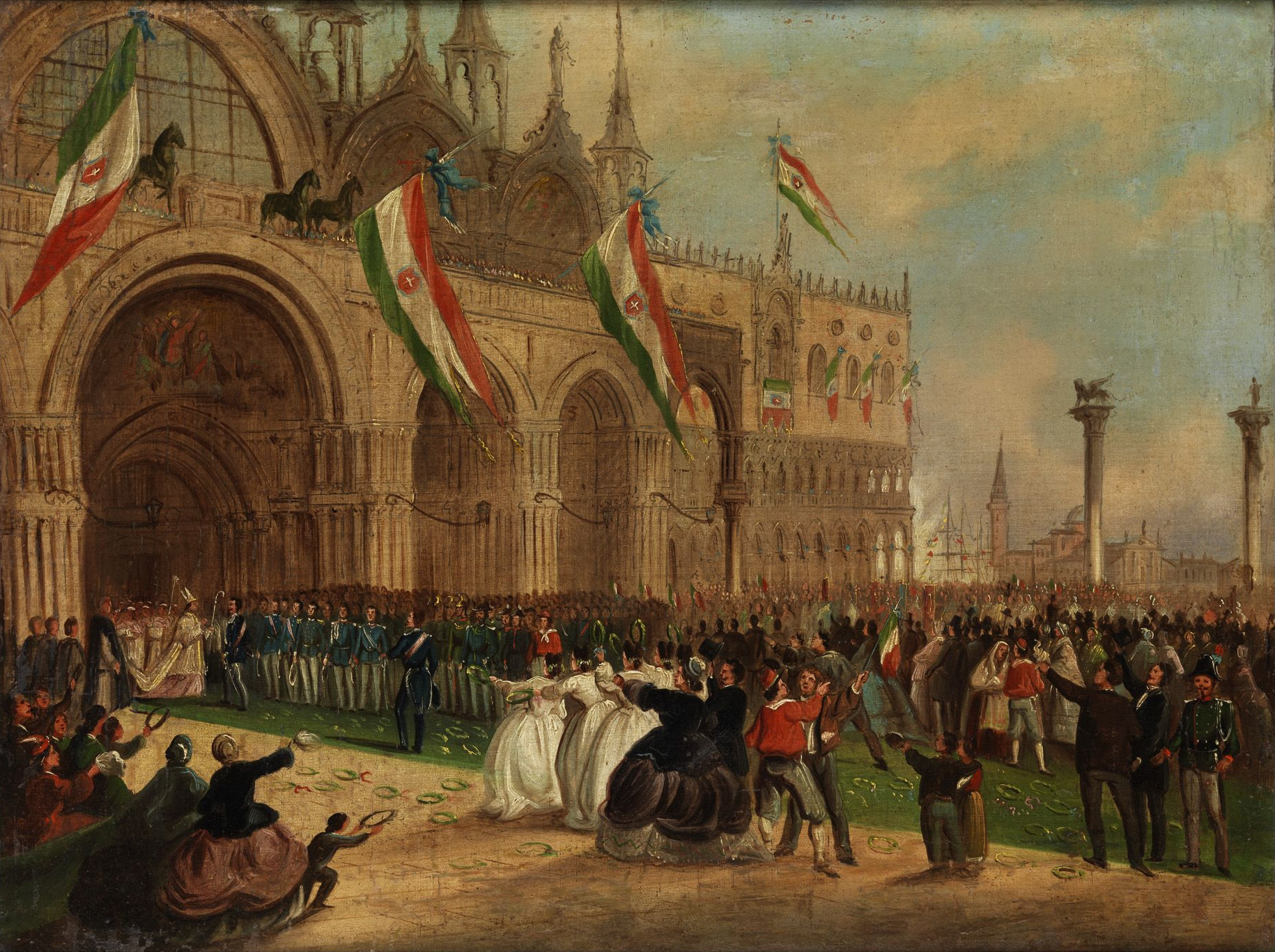
King Victor Emmanuel II of Italy entering Venice during the Third Italian War of Independence (1866) among a profusion of tricolour flags

Venetia remained under Austrian control until the Austro-Prussian War in 1866, when the Kingdom of Italy joined on the Prussian side and was promised Venetia in exchange for its assistance. Austria offered to sell Venetia to Italy, but the Italy refused, seeing it as a dishonourable choice. This resulted in a new southern front for Austria, the Third Italian War of Independence.

Once the wars ended, the Treaty of Vienna ceded the region to neutral France, but left the fortresses under Austrian control for a time. Following protests, the Austrians left, and the French ceded it to Italy on 20 October. A referendum – where only 30% of the adult population voted (as was customary in that period), and did so under government pressure – was held on 21–22 October, and ratified the handover, with a 99.99% majority for Italy.

Uneven economic development reduced many to poverty, making the 19th century, and the first half of the 20th, a period of emigration. Millions of Venetians left their homes and their native land, to seek opportunities in other parts of the world. Many settled in South America (especially in Brazil), and others in Australia, Canada, and the United States of America.

Those who remained in Veneto would experience the turmoil of two world wars. In 1915, Italy entered the First World War on the side of the France and the United Kingdom (after extricating itself from its alliance with Germany and the Austro-Hungarian Empire). Veneto became a major battlefront. After Italian forces suffered an enormous defeat at Caporetto in November 1917, the combined Austro-Hungarian and German forces advanced – almost unhindered – through Veneto, towards Venice, until reaching the Piave River. The Battle of the Piave River prevented these invading troops from advancing further, and was celebrated in La Leggenda del Piave. Between 24 October and 3 November 1918, Italy launched the decisive Battle of Vittorio Veneto, whose outcome assured Italy's victory.

During the fascist era, due to the nationalist policy the Venetian language, as other local languages, was banned in public spaces. Between 1943 and 1945, Veneto belonged to the Italian Social Republic, while the province of Belluno was part of the Prealpine Operations Zone. Many towns in the region were bombed by the Allies during the Second World War. Most hit were Treviso and Vicenza, along with the industrial area around Marghera. The Armistice of Villa Giusti which ended warfare between Italy and Austria-Hungary in the Second World War, was signed at Villa Giusti near Padua.

After the Second World War, many Venetians emigrated to Western European countries; in many of these places, their descendants have maintained the use of their ancestral Venetian dialects.

== Geography ==
=== Geomorphology ===
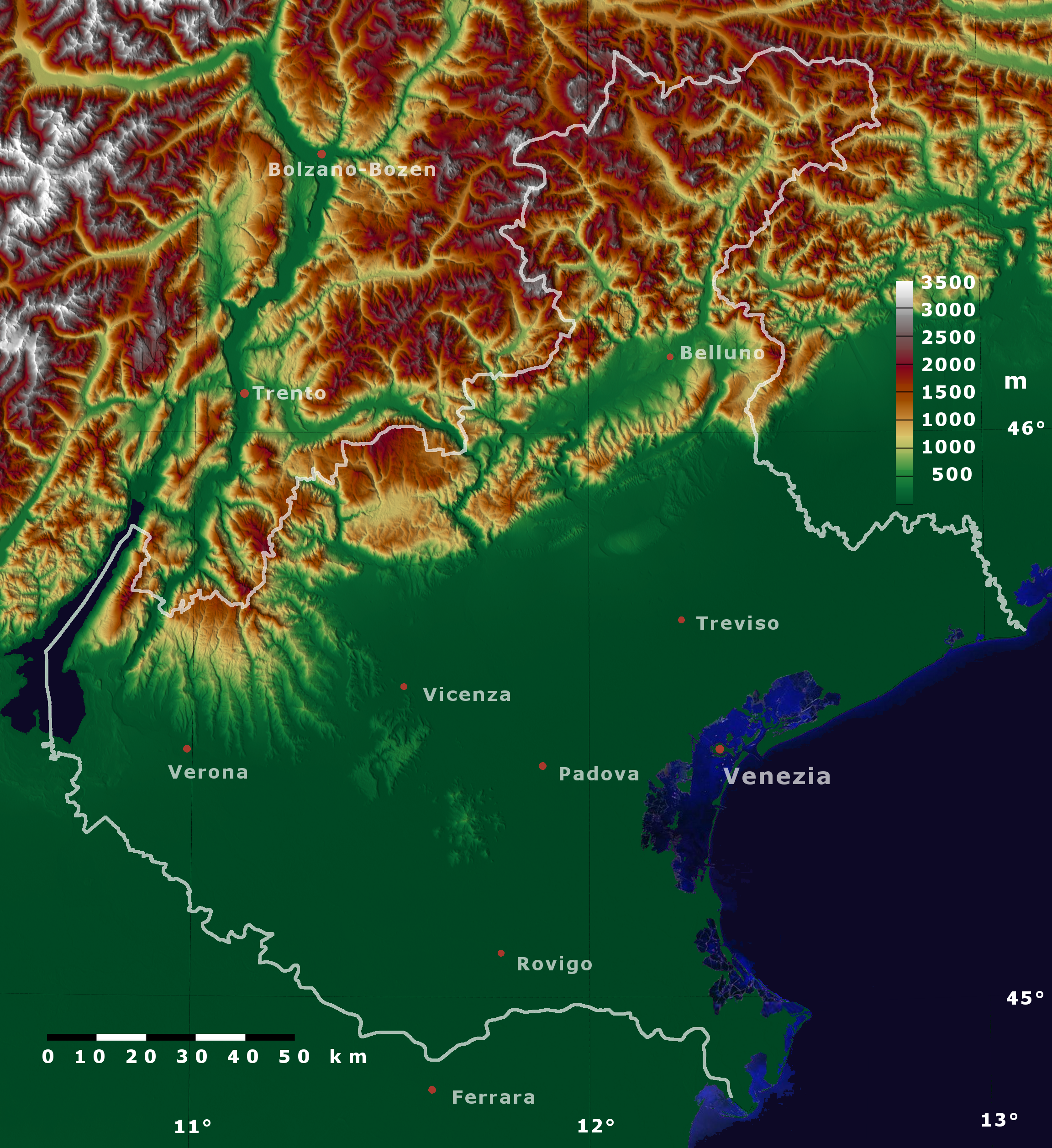
Relief map of Veneto

Veneto is the 8th largest region in Italy, with a total area of 18,398.9 km^{2} (7,103.9 sq mi). It is located in the north-eastern part of Italy and is bordered to the east by Friuli-Venezia Giulia, to the south by Emilia-Romagna, to the west by Lombardy and to the north by Trentino-Alto Adige/Südtirol. In its northernmost corner it also borders Austria.

The north–south extension of Veneto is 210 km (130 mi) from the Austrian border to the mouth of the River Po. By area, 29% of its surface is mountainous (Carnic Alps, eastern Dolomites and Venetian Prealps). The highest massif in the Dolomites is the Marmolada-massif at 3,342 m (10,965 ft). Other dolomitic peaks are the Tre Cime di Lavaredo and the Pale di San Martino. The Venetian Prealps are not as high and range between 700 m (2,300 ft) and 2,200 m (7,200 ft). A distinctive landmark of the Pre-alps are the cave formations, including chasms and sink holes; the Spluta Della Preta, situated in the Monti Lessini chain in the province of Verona, has an explored depth of 985 m (3,232 ft), being the deepest cave in Italy. Fossil deposits are also abundant there.

The Po Valley, covering 57% of Veneto, extends from the mountains to the Adriatic sea, broken only by some low hills: Euganean Hills, Berici Hills, Colli Asolani and Montello, which constitute the remaining 14% of the territory. The plain itself is subdivided into the higher plain (gravel-strewn and not very fertile) and the lower plain (rich in water sources and arable terrain). The lower plain is both a mainstay of agricultural production and the most populated part of the region.

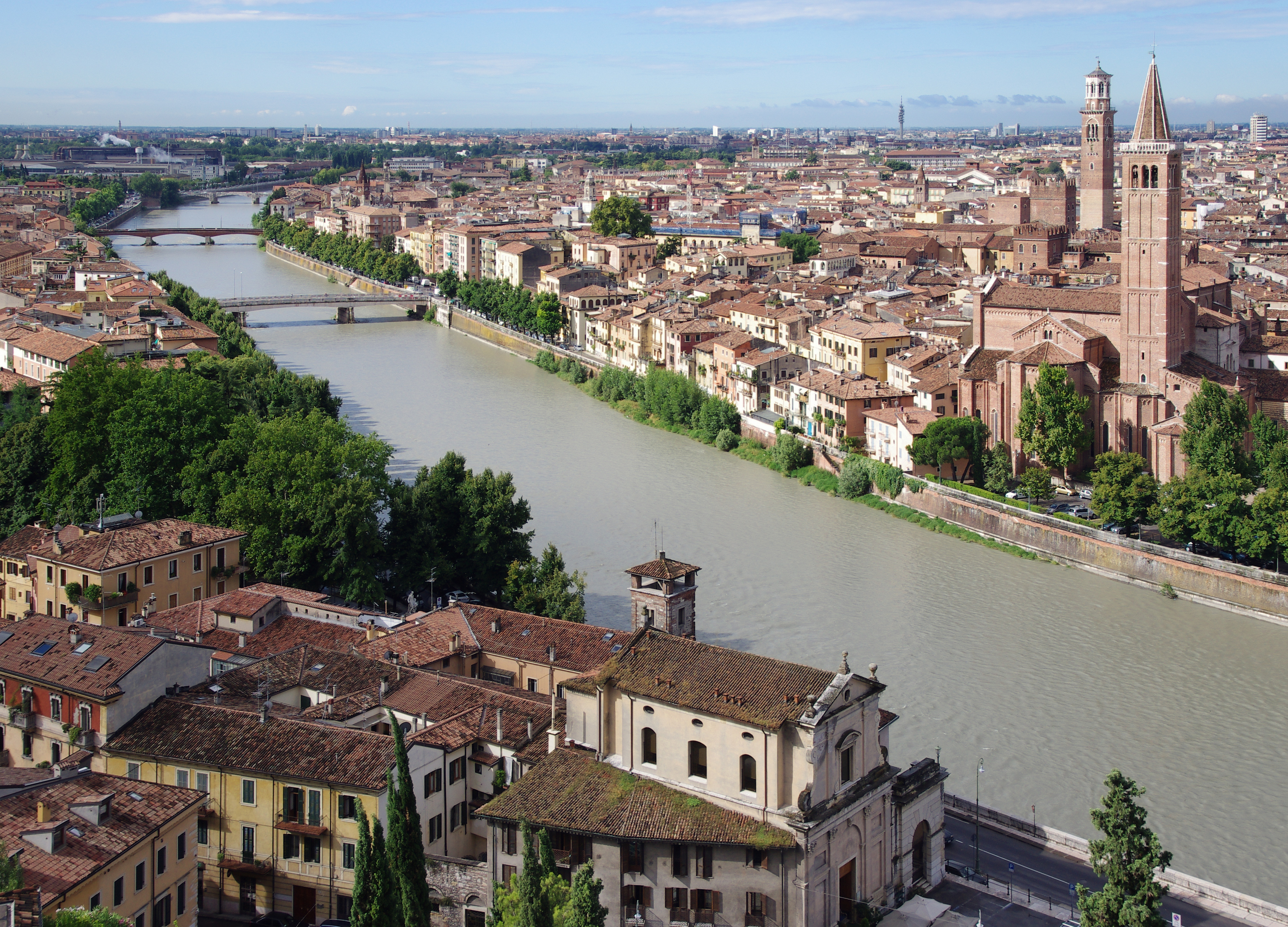
The Adige in Verona

Several rivers flow through the region: the Po, Adige, Brenta, Bacchiglione, Livenza, Piave, and Tagliamento. The eastern shore of the largest lake in Italy, Lake Garda, belongs to Veneto. The coastline covers approximately 200 km (120 mi), of which 100 km (62 mi) are beaches.

The coasts of the Adriatic Sea are characterised by the Venetian Lagoon, a flat terrain with ponds, marshes and islands. The Po Delta to the south features sandbars and dunes along the coastline. The inland portion contains cultivable land recently reclaimed by a system of canals and dykes. Fish ponds have been created there as well. The delta and the lagoon are a stopping-point for migratory birds.

Veneto's morphology is characterised by its:

- mountains (montagna): 5,359.1 km^{2} (2,069.2 sq mi), (117 comuni being classified as mountainous);
- hills (collina): 2,663.9 km^{2} (1,028.5 sq mi), (120 hilly comuni);
- and plains (pianura): 10,375.9 km^{2} (4,006.2 sq mi), (344 comuni mostly situated in the Po Valley).

=== Climate ===
The climate changes significantly from one area to another: while it is continental on the plains, it is milder along the Adriatic coast; around the Lake Garda and in the hilly areas. The lowlands are often covered by thick fog, in winter; precipitations that are scarce – 750 mm per year – close to the river Po, but are more abundant – from 750 to 1100 mm per year – at higher altitudes; the highest values – up to 3200 mm per year – are recorded in the Bellunese Prealps, near Mount Pasubio and on the Asiago plateau.

== Government and politics ==
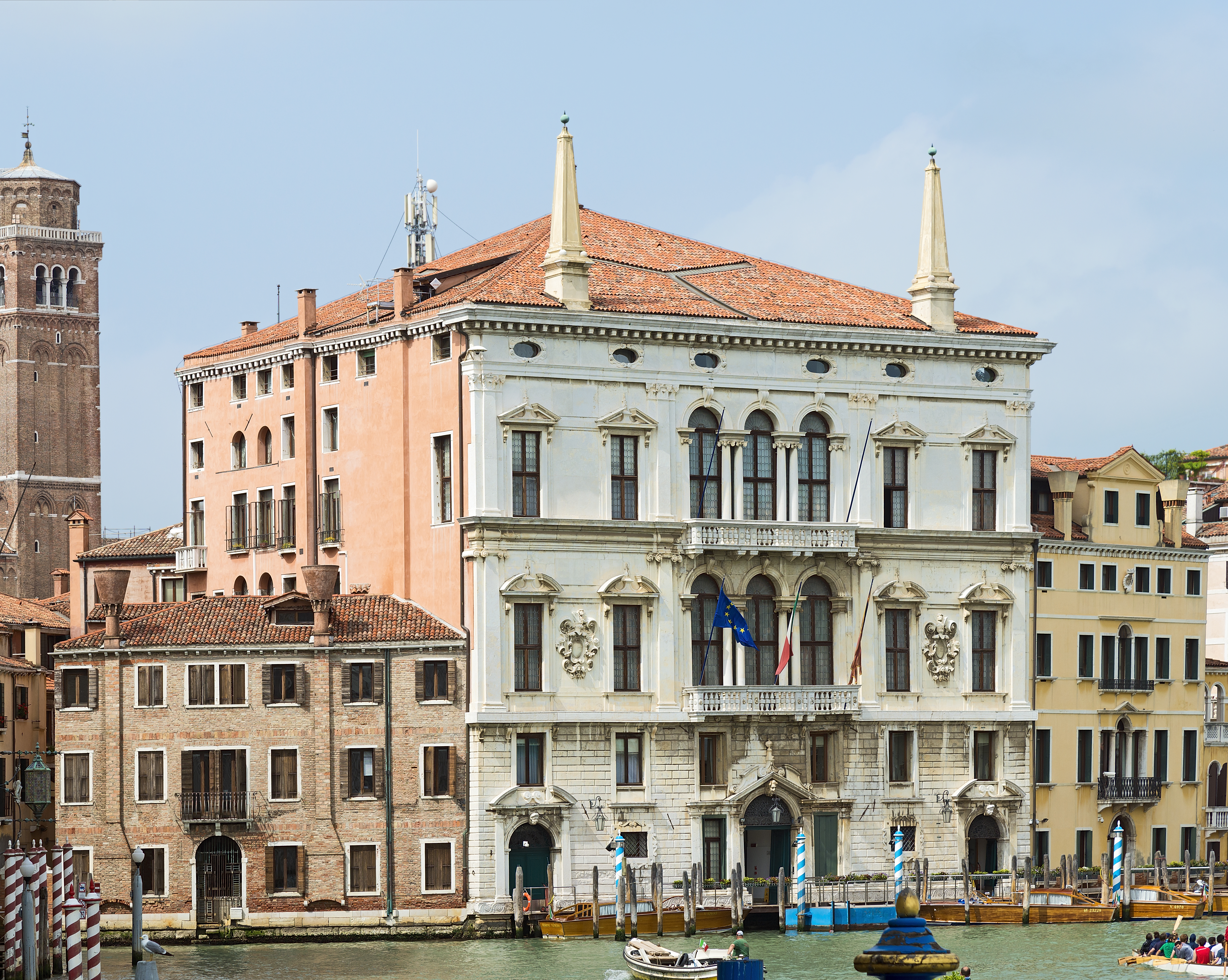
Palazzo Balbi, Venice, the seat of the regional government

Veneto is a semi-presidential representative democracy. The President of Veneto, colloquially nicknamed Governor or even Doge in remembrance of Venice's traditional head of state, is also the head of the Regional Government. Legislative power is exerted by the Regional Council, the local parliament. The Statute (i.e. the law establishing and regulating the regional institution, which was first promulgated on 22 May 1971), uses the term "people" for Venetians, but, like in the case of Sardinians, this is not a legal recognition of any differences from other Italian citizens. Moreover, the region is not granted a form of autonomy comparable to that of neighbouring Friuli-Venezia Giulia and Trentino-Alto Adige/Südtirol. This is the reason why many municipalities have held referendums in order to be united to these regions. According to Robert D. Putnam, the "institutional performance" of Veneto's regional government is higher than average in Italy and Veneto belongs to the "civic North".

Traditionally a very Catholic region, Veneto was once the heartland of Christian Democracy, which won a record 60.5% of the vote in the 1948 general election, polled above 50% in each and every general and regional election until 1983 and governed the region since its establishment in 1970 to 1994. After that, Veneto has been a stronghold of the centre-right coalition, which has governed the region since 1995, under President Giancarlo Galan (Forza Italia/The People of Freedom, 1995–2010), Luca Zaia (Liga Veneta–Lega Nord, 2010–2025) and Alberto Stefani (Liga Veneta–Lega, 2025–present). In the 2025 regional election Liga Veneta was the largest party with 36.3% of the vote, followed by the three main Italian parties, the Brothers of Italy (18.7%), the Democratic Party (16.6%), and Forza Italia (6.3%).

=== Venetian nationalism ===
Flag of the Republic of Venice

Flag of Veneto

Venetian nationalism is a regionalist/nationalist political movement which gained prominence in Veneto during the 1970s and 1980s, demanding more autonomy, a special statute or even independence, and promoting Venetian culture, language and history. This is the political background in which the Liga Veneta (LV) was launched in 1980. Other regionalist/nationalist groupings, including Liga Veneta Repubblica (LVR), North-East Project and the avowed separatist Veneto State, Venetian Independence (IV) and Plebiscito.eu, emerged but they have never touched the popularity of the LV, which was a founding member of Lega Nord in 1991. Currently, other than the LV, Resist Veneto and the LVR are represented in the Council.

IV and other alike groups have been long proposing a referendum on the independence of Veneto from Italy. After the Regional Council approved a resolution on self-determination (with an explicit reference to a referendum) in November 2012, a referendum bill was proposed in April 2013. Plebiscite 2013 organised an online referendum, with no official recognition, for 16–21 March 2014. According to organisers, turnout was 63.2% (2.36 million voters) and 89.1% of participants (56.6 of all eligible voters) voted yes. Several news sources, however, contested these results, saying that participants were at most 135,000 (3.6% of eligible voters) based on public independent web traffic statistics. On 22 October 2017 an official autonomy referendum took place in Veneto: 57.2% of Venetians participated and 98.1% voted "yes".

=== Administrative divisions ===
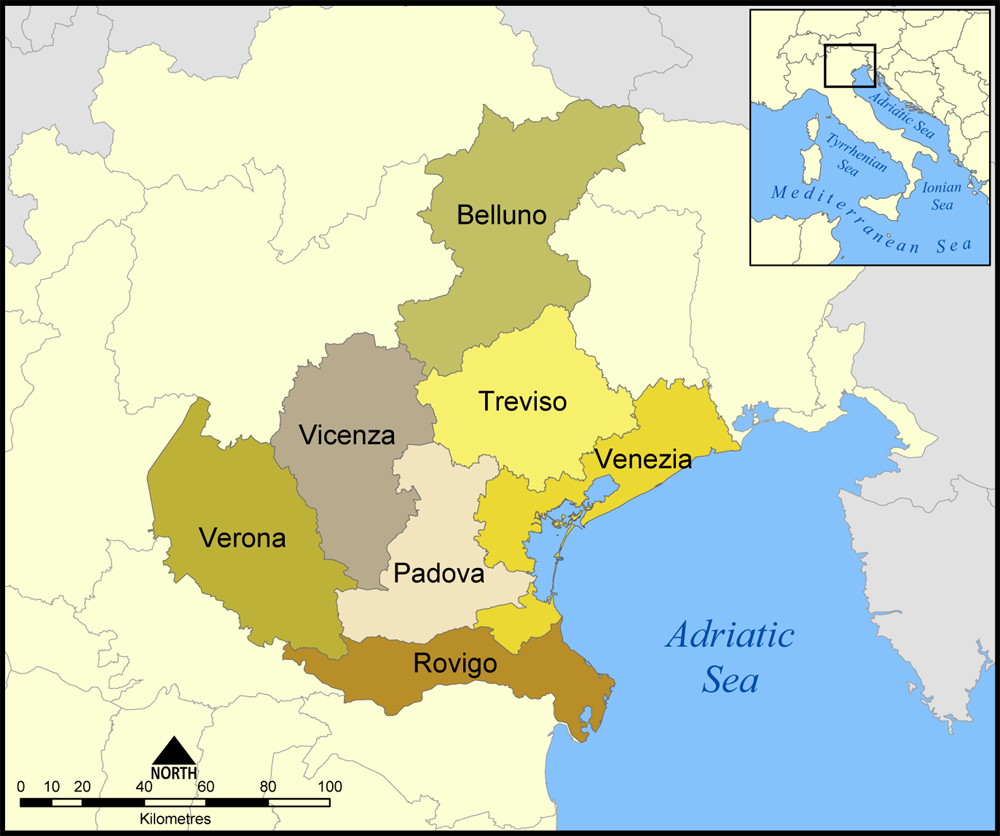
Veneto's provinces

Veneto is divided into the Metropolitan City of Venice and 6 provinces and also divided in 560 municipalities. Of the seven provinces of the region, the Province of Padua is the most populous and has the greatest density, with 422.8 persons per km^{2}, reaching 2,232.5 in the city of Padua. In contrast the capital city, Venice, has a moderate density of 599.8. The least populated and densely populated is Belluno (54.7), which is the largest in area and the most mountainous.

Province	Code	Population (2026)	Area (km^{2})	Density (inh./km^{2})
Province of Belluno	BL	197,265	3,610.20	54.6
Province of Padua	PD	934,540	2,144.15	435.9
Province of Rovigo	RO	227,183	1,819.35	124.9
Province of Treviso	TV	878,341	2,479.83	354.2
Metropolitan City of Venice	VE	834,077	2,472.91	337.3
Province of Verona	VR	930,842	3,096.39	300.6
Province of Vicenza	VI	855,212	2,722.53	314.1

== Demographics ==
Historical population
Year	Pop.	±%
1871	2,194,872	—
1881	2,345,137	+6.8%
1901	2,578,402	+9.9%
1911	3,007,713	+16.7%
1921	3,317,183	+10.3%
1931	3,485,765	+5.1%
1936	3,564,811	+2.3%
1951	3,916,506	+9.9%
1961	3,845,039	−1.8%
1971	4,121,997	+7.2%
1981	4,343,668	+5.4%
1991	4,379,424	+0.8%
2001	4,526,335	+3.4%
2011	4,855,904	+7.3%
2021	4,847,745	−0.2%
Source: ISTAT

Veneto has 4,857,460 inhabitants as of 2026, ranking it as the 5th most populated region in Italy. Veneto is also the 5th most densely populated region at 264.8 inhabitants per km^{2}. This is particularly true in the provinces of Padua, Venice and Treviso, where the inhabitants per km^{2} are above 300. Belluno is the least densely populated province, with 54.6 inhabitants per km^{2}. 49.4% of the population are male, and 50.6% are female. Minors make up 14.4% of the population, and seniors make up 25.3%.

Like the other regions of Northern Italy and Central Italy, though with a certain time lag, Veneto has been experiencing a phase of very slow population growth caused by the dramatic fall in fertility. The overall population has so far been increasing – though only slightly – due to the net immigration started at the end of the 1980s, after more than 20 years of massive exodus from the poorer areas of the region.

=== Migration ===
Nearly 3 million Venetians left their country between 1861 and 1961 to escape poverty. Many emigrated to Brazil and Argentina. After World War II, they moved to other European countries. In 2008, there were 260,849 Venetian citizens living outside of Italy (5.4% of the region's population), the largest number was found in Brazil, with 57,052 Venetians, followed by Switzerland, with 38,320, and Argentina, with 31,823. There are several million people of Venetian descent around the world, particularly in Brazil, in the states of Rio Grande do Sul, Santa Catarina, São Paulo and Paraná. Local names in Southern Brazil such as Nova Schio, Nova Bassano, Nova Bréscia, Nova Treviso, Nova Veneza, Nova Pádua and Monteberico indicate the Venetian origin of their inhabitants. In recent years, people of Venetian descent from Brazil and Argentina have been migrating to Italy.

Due to the impressive economic growth of the last two decades, Veneto has turned into a land of immigration and has been attracting more and more immigrants since the 1990s.

Foreign population by country of birth (2025)
Country of birth	Population
Romania	94,219
Morocco	59,999
Moldova	59,154
Albania	49,642
China	27,534
Bangladesh	25,785
Ukraine	23,643
India	23,458
Brazil	20,891
Switzerland	18,867
North Macedonia	14,526
Nigeria	13,314
Sri Lanka	13,276
Kosovo	12,183
Senegal	11,679

As of 2025, immigrants make up 13.9% of the population. The 5 largest foreign countries of birth are Romania, Morocco, Moldova, Albania, and China.

=== Religion ===
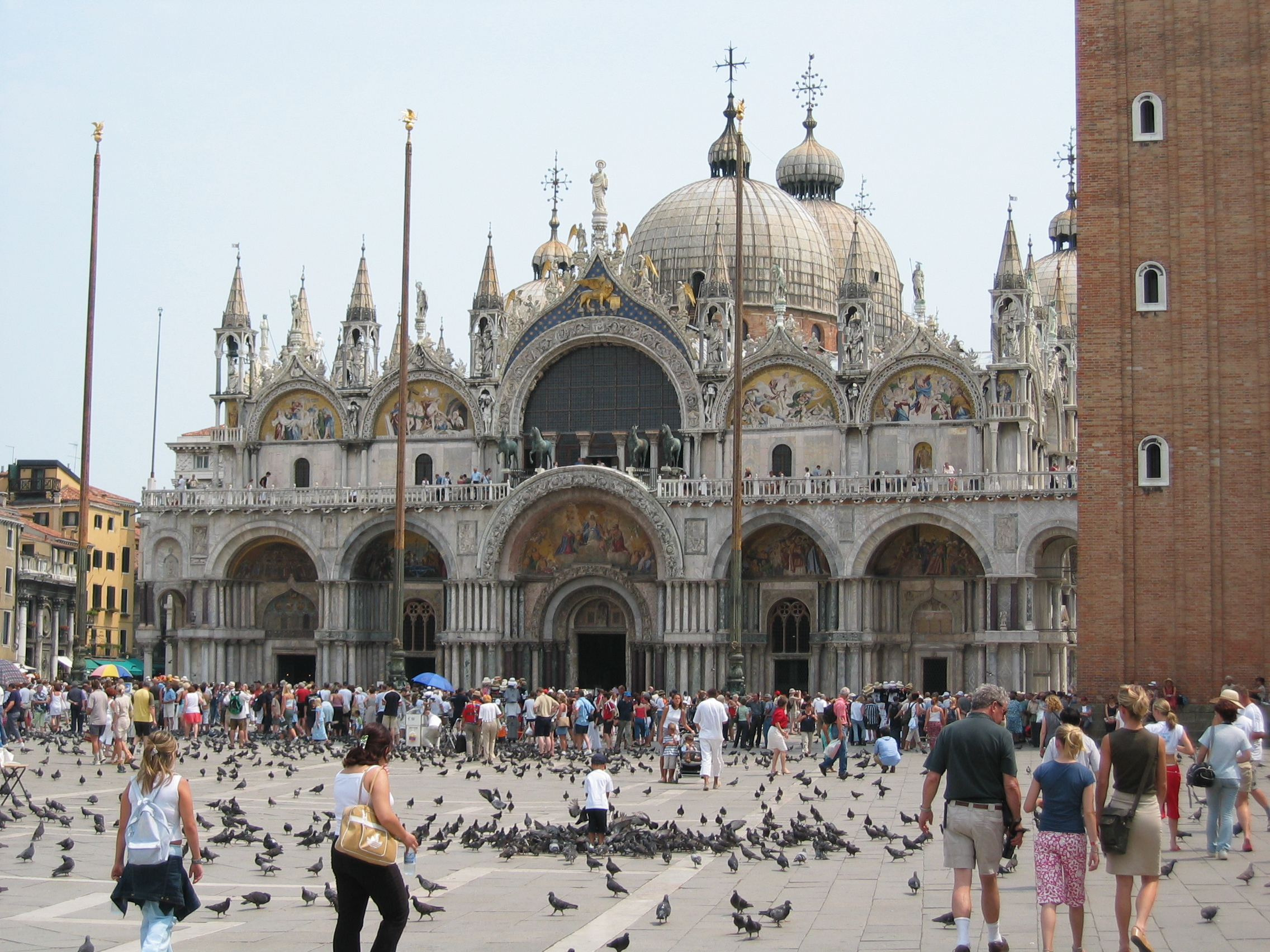
St Mark's Basilica, the seat of the Patriarch of Venice. It is one of the best known examples of Italo-Byzantine architecture.

Veneto converted to Christianity during Roman rule. The region venerates as its patrons the 2nd-century bishop St. Hermagoras and his deacon St. Fortunatus, both of Aquileia and both martyrs. Aquileia became the metropolitan see of Venetia. Aquileia had its own liturgical rites which were used throughout the dioceses of Veneto until the later Middle Ages when the Roman Rite replaced the Aquileian Rite. By the 6th century the bishop of Aquileia claimed the title of patriarch. Rejection of the Second Council of Constantinople (553) led to a schism wherein the bishops of Aquileia, Liguria, Aemilia, Milan and of the Istrian peninsula all refused to condemn the Three Chapters leading to the churches of Veneto to break communion with the Church of Rome. The invasion of the non-Catholic Lombards in 568 only served to prolong the schism until 606 and then finally 699 when the Synod of Pavia definitively ended the schism.

In 2004, over 95% of the population claimed to be Roman Catholic. The region of Veneto along with the regions of Friuli and Trentino-Alto Adige/Südtirol form the ecclesiastical region of Triveneto under the Patriarchate of Venice. The Patriarchate of Venice is an archdiocese and metropolitan see of an ecclesiastical region which includes suffragan episcopal sees of Adria-Rovigo, Belluno-Feltre, Chioggia, Concordia-Pordenone, Padua, Treviso, Verona, Vicenza, and Vittorio Veneto.

The Archdiocese of Venice was elevated to an honorary Patriarchate by the pope on 8 October 1457 when the Patriarchate of Grado, a successor to the Patriarchate of Aquileia, was suppressed. The first patriarch of Venice was St. Laurence, a nobleman of the Giustiniani family.

During the 20th century the patriarchs were usually appointed cardinal, and three cardinal patriarchs, Giuseppe Sarto, Angelo Roncalli, and Albino Luciani, were elected pope: Pius X, John XXIII, and John Paul I, respectively. The Patriarchate of Venice claims St. Mark the Evangelist as its patron. The same saint, symbolised by a winged lion, had become the typical symbol of the Venetian Republic and is still represented on many civic symbols.

=== Largest cities ===
#	Municipality	Population (2026)	Area (km^{2})	Density (inh./km^{2})	Elevation (m amsl)	Province
1	Verona	255,139	198.92	1,282.6	59	VR
2	Venice	249,385	415.90	599.6	1	VE
3	Padua	208,202	93.03	2,238.0	12	PD
4	Vicenza	110,741	80.57	1,374.5	39	VI
5	Treviso	86,113	55.58	1,549.4	15	TV
6	Rovigo	49,994	108.81	459.5	6	RO
7	Chioggia	46,951	187.91	249.9	2	VE
8	Bassano del Grappa	42,279	47.06	898.4	129	VI
9	San Donà di Piave	42,261	78.88	535.8	3	VE
10	Schio	38,989	66.21	588.9	200	VI

== Economy ==
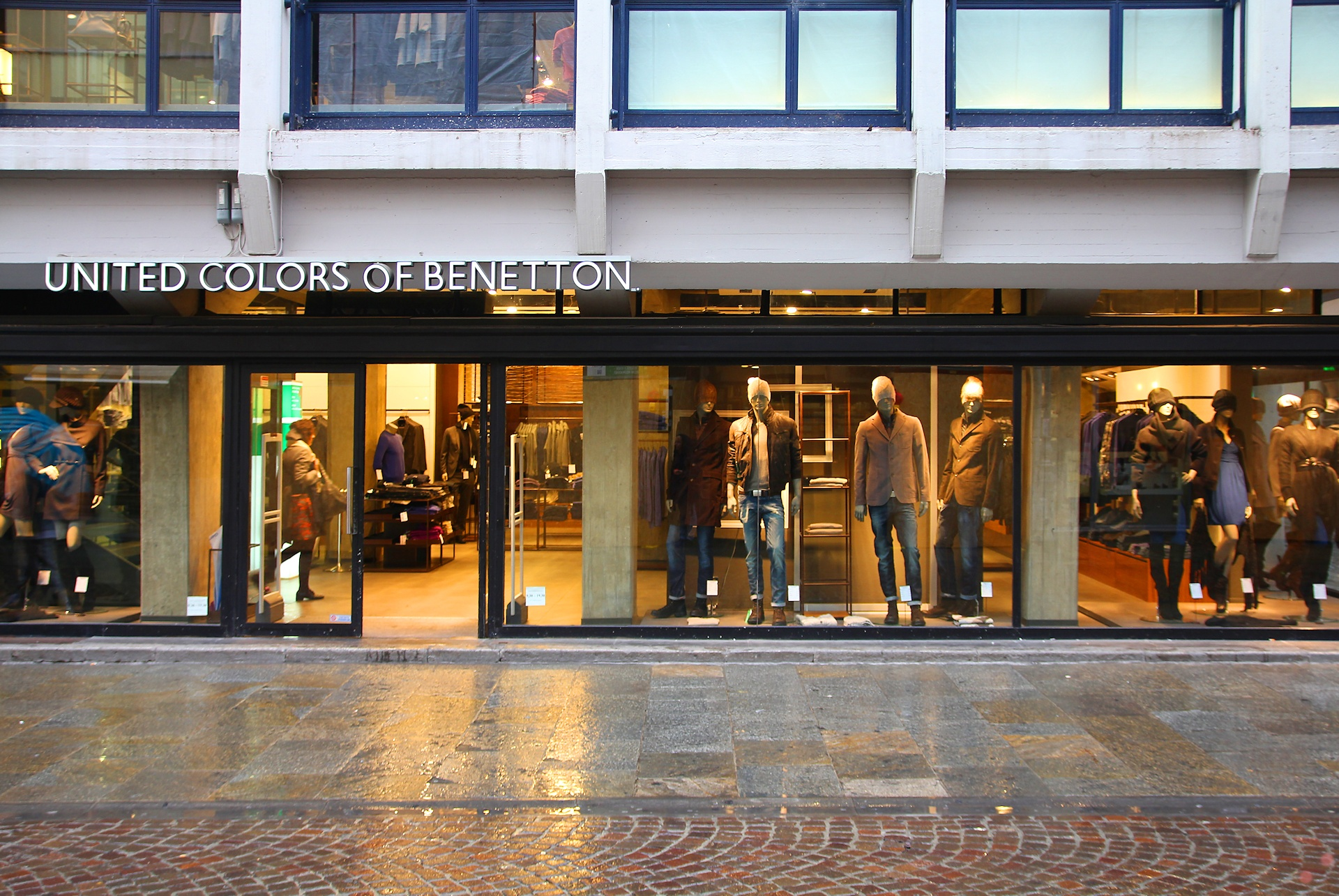
United Colors of Benetton store in Parma, Italy

Under Austrian rule, Veneto's agriculturally-based economy suffered, which later led to mass emigration. But, since the 1970s it has seen impressive development, thanks to the so-called "Veneto development model" that is characterised by strong export-oriented entrepreneurship in traditional economic sectors (€64.47 billion of exports in 2019) and close social cohesion – making it actually the third richest region in terms of total GDP (€166.4 billion) after Lombardy and Lazio.

Geography and historical events have determined the present social and economic structure of the region, centred on a broad belt running from east to west. The plain and the Alpine foothills are the most developed areas in contrast to the Po delta and the mountainous areas, with the exception of the surroundings of Belluno. This is why the Alps and the province of Rovigo are suffering more than other areas, from a trend of declining and ageing population.

=== Agriculture ===
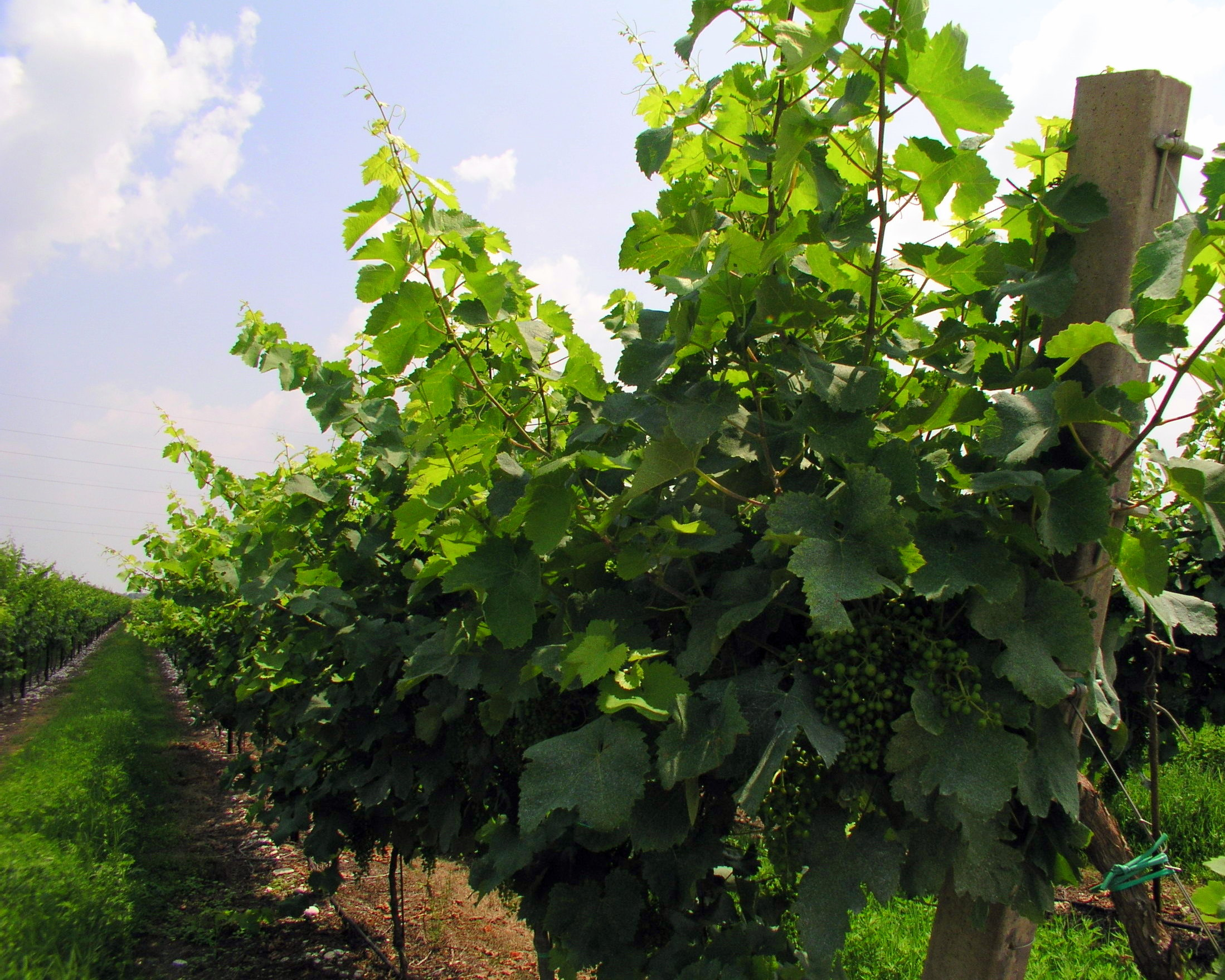
Glera grapes on the vine in the Prosecco zone, pre-veraison

Though its importance has been decreasing for the past 20–30 years, agriculture continues to play a significant role in the regional economy. The agricultural sector of Veneto is among the most productive in Italy. However, it is still characterised by an intensive use of labour rather than capital, due to the specialisation in market gardening, fruit-growing and vine-growing throughout the plain and the foothills, requiring very much handicraft. In the south and in the extreme east of the region, grain crops are more common and land holdings are larger than in the rest of the region; mechanisation is more advanced here. The cattle stock, although declining, still represented 15% of the national stock. Fishing is also still important in coastal areas.

The main agricultural products include maize, green peas, vegetables, apples, cherries, sugar beets, forage, tobacco, hemp. Moreover, Veneto is one of Italy's most important wine-growing areas, producing wines, such as Prosecco, Valpolicella, and Soave. Overall, Veneto produces more bottles of DOC wine than any other area in Italy. The Amarone della Valpolicella, a wine from the hills around Verona, is made with high-selected grapes and is among the more expensive red wines in the world.

=== Industry ===
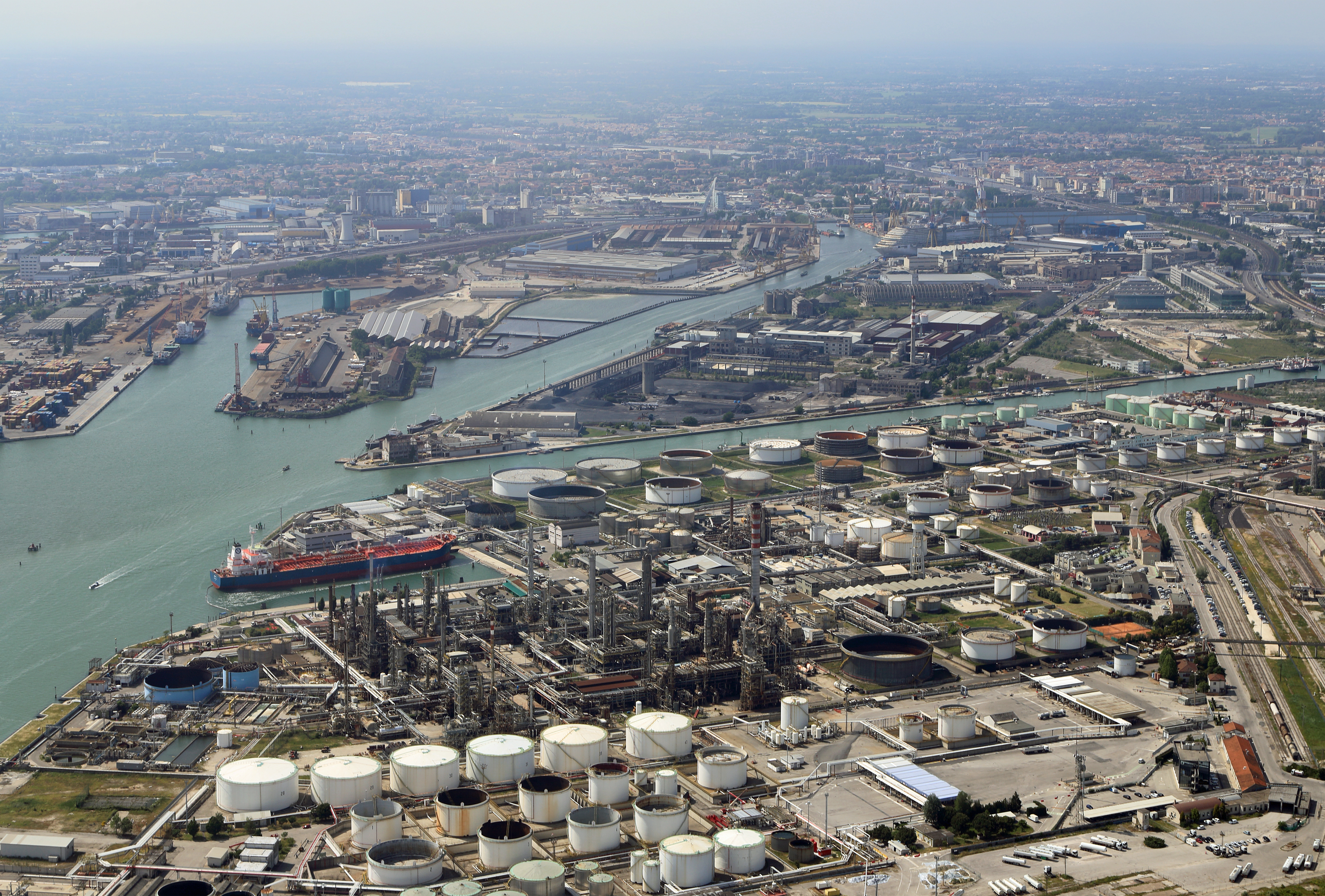
View of Marghera

In the last 30–40 years industrialisation transformed the appearance of the landscape, especially in the plains.

The regional industry is especially made of small and medium-sized businesses, which are active in several sectors: food products, wood and furniture, leather and footwear, textiles and clothing, gold jewelry, but also chemistry, metal-mechanics and electronics. This has led to the establishment of a strongly export-orientated system of industries.

Typical of Veneto is the partition of the territory into industrial districts, which means that each area tends to specialise in a specific sector. The province of Venice hosts large metallurgical and chemical plants in Marghera and Mestre, but is also specialised in glass handicraft (Murano). The province of Belluno hosts the so-called eyeglasses district, being the largest world manufacturer Luxottica a firm domiciled at Agordo. Other important firms are Safilo, De Rigo, Marcolin.

Veneto is home to a thriving fashion industry with brands such as Benetton, Bottega Veneta, Geox, Diesel, Golden Goose, Calzedonia, Pal Zileri, Dainese, Lotto, Marzotto, Tecnica Group all originating from the area.

Other large Venetian companies are Aprilia, AGV, Campagnolo, De'Longhi, Fedrigoni, Laverda, Permasteelisa, Pinarello, Wilier Triestina, Zamperla.

During the last 20 years, a large number of Venetian companies relocated their plants (especially the most dangerous and polluting productions) in Eastern Europe, especially Romania. The Romanian city of Timișoara is also called "the newest Venetian province".

=== Tourism ===
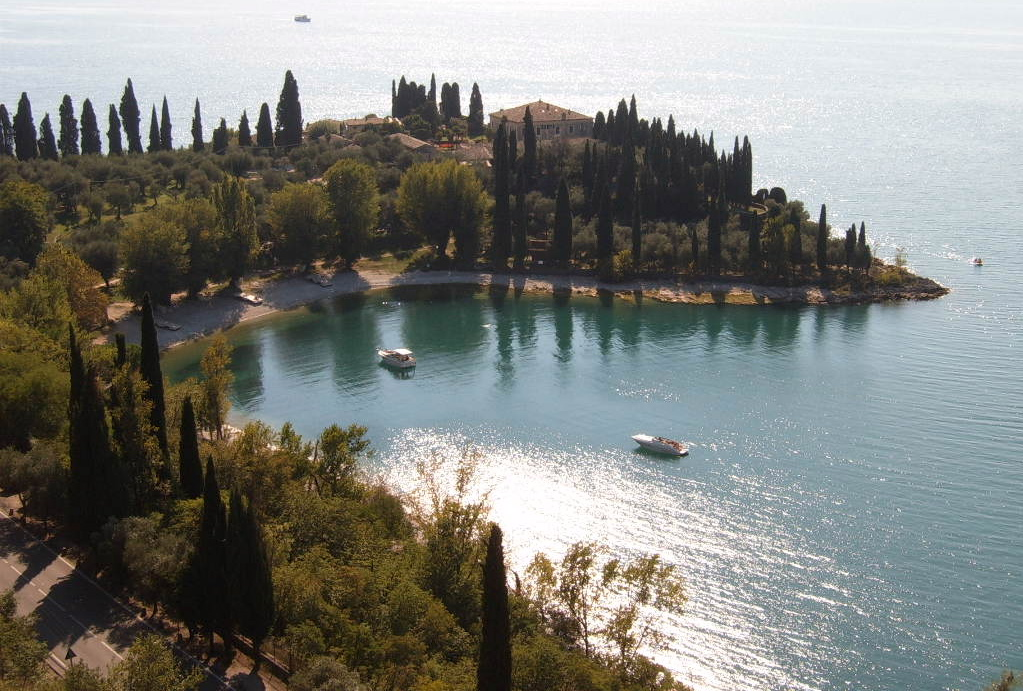
The Punta San Vigilio on the Lake Garda

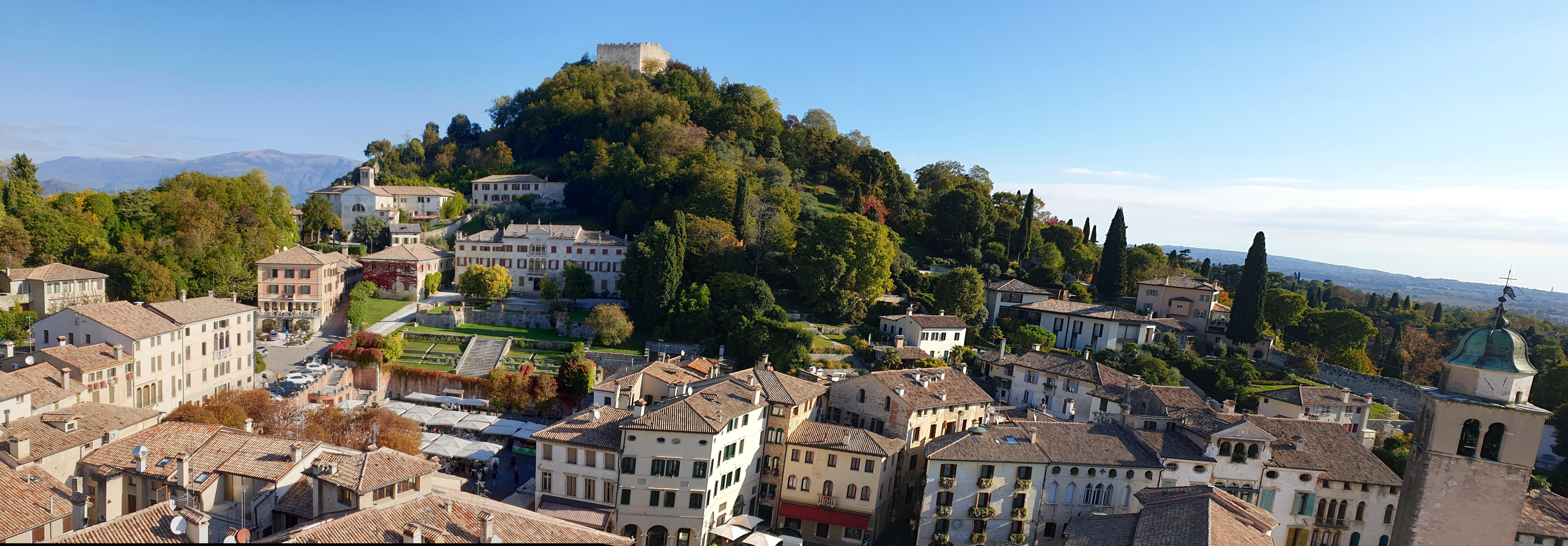
Aerial view of the Venetian village of Asolo, province of Treviso

Although being a heavily industrialised region, tourism is one of its main economic resources; one-fifth of Italy's foreign tourism gravitates towards Veneto, which is the first region in Italy in terms of tourist presence, attracting over 60 million visitors every year, second after Emilia-Romagna in terms of hotel industry structures; the business volume of tourism in Veneto is estimated to be in the vicinity of 12 billion Euros.

Veneto has many small and picturesque villages, 11 of them have been selected by I Borghi più belli d'Italia (English: The most beautiful Villages of Italy), a non-profit private association of small Italian towns of strong historical and artistic interest, that was founded on the initiative of the Tourism Council of the National Association of Italian Municipalities. These villages are:

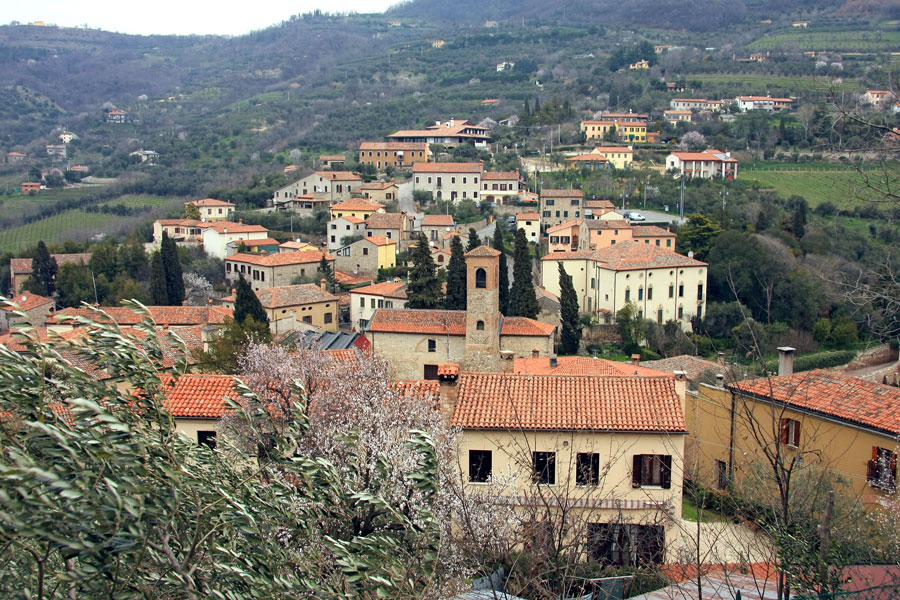
Arquà Petrarca

- Arquà Petrarca
- Asolo
- Borghetto
- Cison di Valmarino
- Follina
- Malcesine
- Mel di Borgo Valbelluna
- Montagnana
- Portobuffolé
- San Giorgio
- Sottoguda

=== Statistics ===
==== Historical GDP ====
A table which shows Veneto's GDP growth:

	2000	2001	2002	2003	2004	2005	2006	2015
Gross Domestic Product (million €)	111,713.5	116,334.1	118,886.3	124,277.6	130,715.9	133,488.0	138,993.5	166,400
GDP per capita (PPP) (€)	24,842.9	25,742.2	26,108.2	26,957.1	27,982.2	28,286.7	29,225.5	33,500

==== Economic sectors ====
The main sectors in the economy of Veneto are:

Economic activity	GDP product	% sector (region)	% sector (Italy)
Primary (agriculture, farming, fishing)	€2,303.3	1.66%	1.84%
Secondary (industry, processing, manufacturing)	€34,673.6	24.95%	18.30%
Constructions	€8,607.7	6.19%	5.41%
Tertiary (Commerce, hotels and restaurants, tourism, (tele)communications and transport)	€28,865.8	20.77%	20.54%
Financial activities and real estate	€31,499.4	22.66%	24.17%
Other types of services	€19,517.2	14.04%	18.97%
VAT and taxes	€13,526.4	9.73%	10.76%
GDP of Veneto (2020)	€163 billion		

==== Unemployment rate ====
The unemployment rate stood at 5.8% in 2020 and was lower than the national average. However, Veneto was along with Liguria the only northern region where the unemployment rate increased between 2017 and 2018.

Year	2006	2007	2008	2009	2010	2011	2012	2013	2014	2015	2016	2017	2018	2019	2020
unemployment rate (in %)	4.1%	3.4%	3.4%	4.7%	5.7%	4.9%	6.4%	7.6%	7.5%	7.1%	6.8%	6.3%	6.4%	5.7%	5.8%

== Culture ==
=== Art and architecture ===
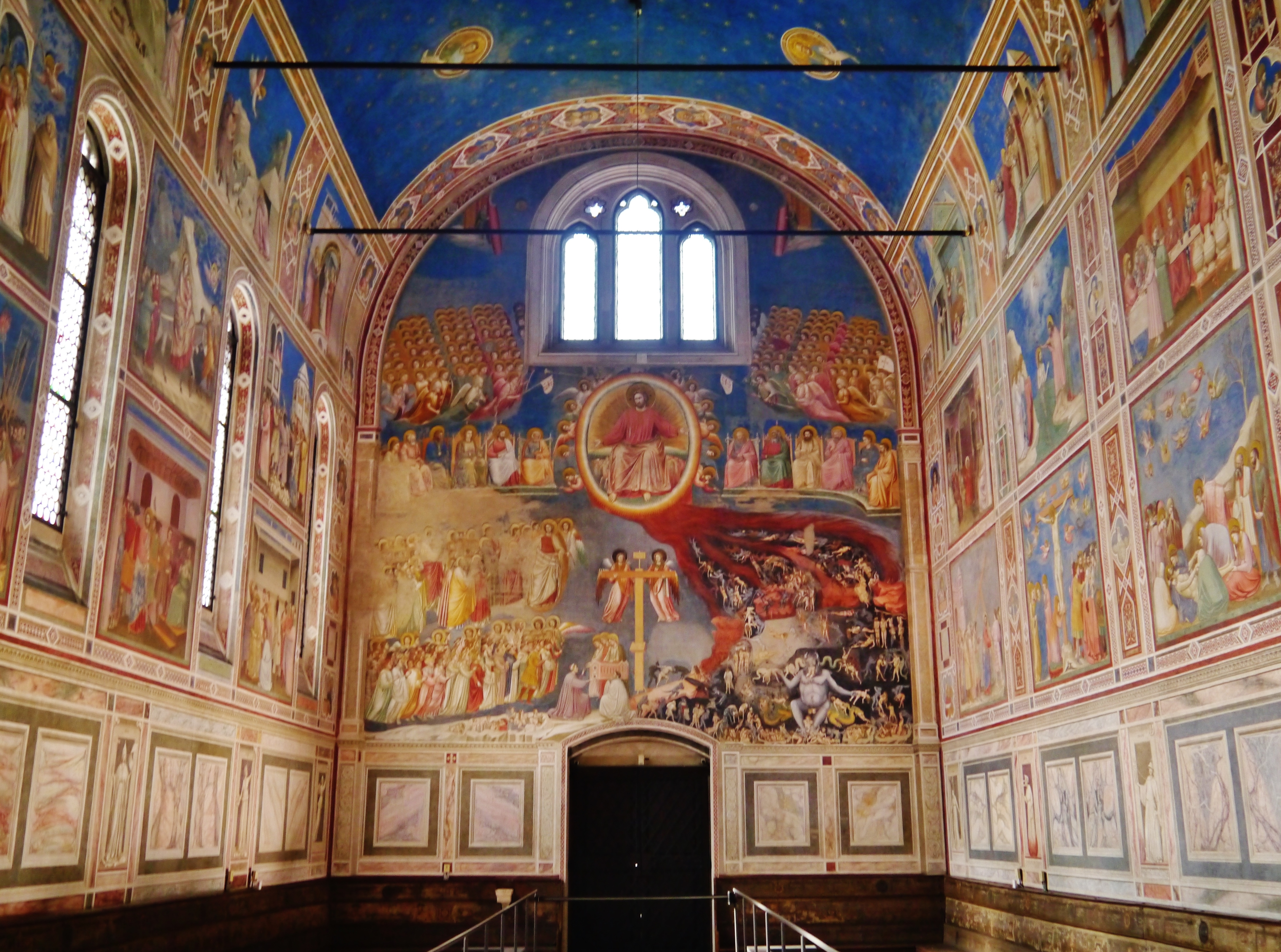
Scrovegni Chapel in Padua contains a fresco cycle by Giotto, an important masterpiece of Western art.

The Middle Ages stimulated the creation of monumental works such as the complex of churches on the island of Torcello, in the Venetian lagoon, with the Cathedral of Santa Maria Assunta founded in 639, its bell tower erected in the 11th century and the adjacent Martyrium of Santa Fosca built around the 1100, notable for the mosaics. They saw the construction of the Basilica of San Zeno Maggiore in Verona, which was Veneto's main centre for that esthetic movement and we note, by the mixture of styles that Verona was an important crossroads to the north of Europe. Examples of Gothic art, in addition to the Venetian church of Santa Maria Gloriosa dei Frari and that of Santi Giovanni e Paolo, are the Scaliger Tombs in the historical centre of Verona.

While in Veneto Byzantine art was important, an element of innovation was brought to Padua by Giotto, bearer of a new pictorial tradition: that of Tuscany. Towards the 1302 he was commissioned by Enrico Scrovegni to paint the family chapel, now known just by the name of Scrovegni Chapel, one of the most important artistic monuments of Padua and Veneto. The influences of the contribution of Giotto were felt immediately, as in the frescoes of Giusto de' Menabuoi in the Baptistry near the Cathedral of Padua and those of Altichiero in the Basilica of Saint Anthony.

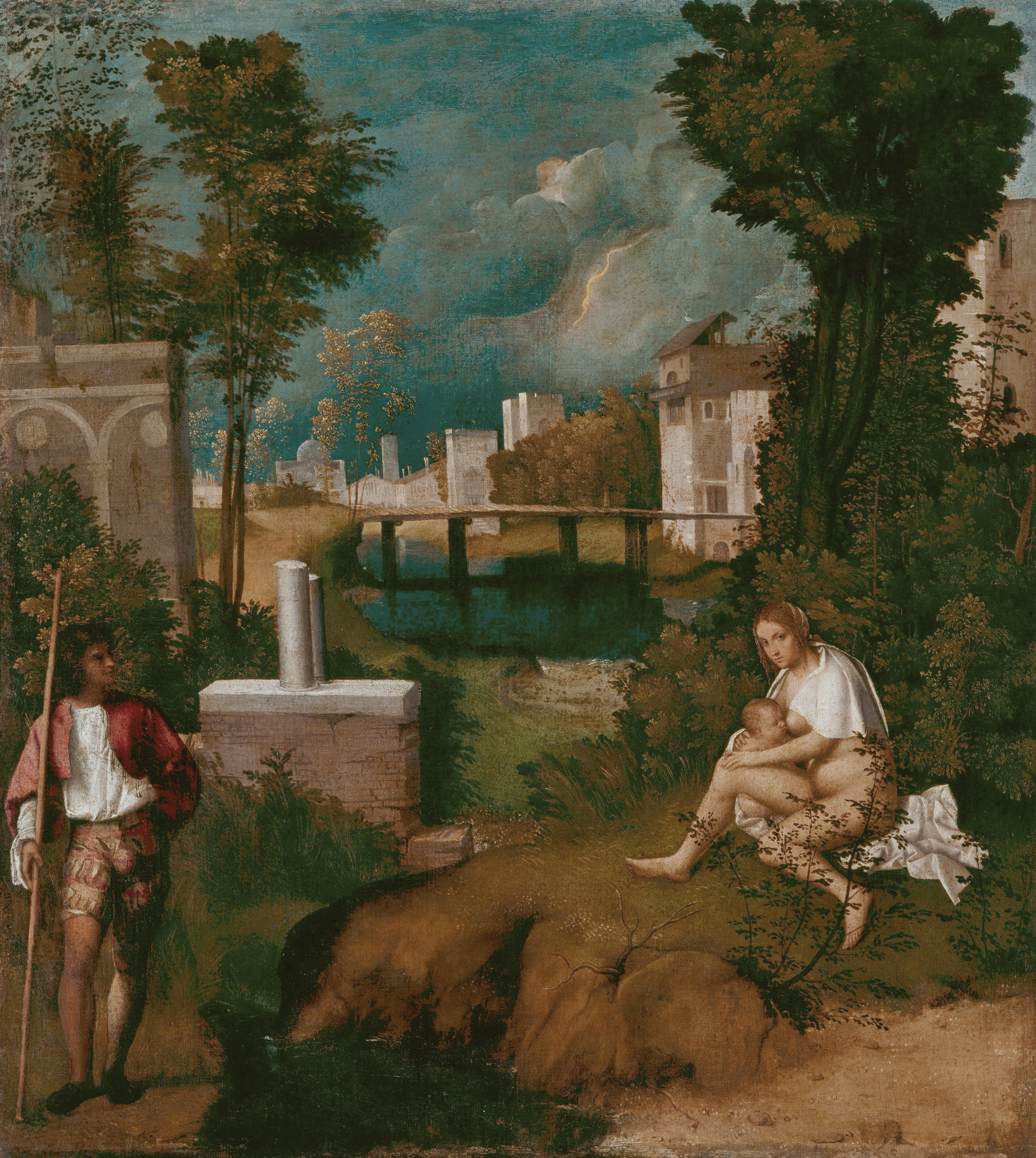
Giorgione's The Tempest

After a phase of development of Gothic art, with the creation of important works including the Ca' d'Oro and the Doge's Palace in Venice, and the churches of Santa Maria Gloriosa dei Frari and of Saints John and Paul in Venice, the influence of the Renaissance ushered in a new era. In addition to Donatello, an important Venetian Renaissance artist was Andrea Mantegna (1431–1506), whose most important work in Veneto is perhaps the San Zeno Altarpiece, found in Verona. With the mainland expansion of the Venetian Republic and the consolidation of its institutions, there was also an artistic development of exceptional stature: Mantegna, Vittore Carpaccio, Giovanni Bellini, Cima da Conegliano, Pordenone laid the foundations for what would be the age of Venetian painting.

Padua was a cradle of the Venetian Renaissance, Where influences from Tuscany and Umbria filtered north. Amongst the Renaissance artists who worked there were Donatello, who worked on an altar of the Basilica of Saint Anthony, and Pisanello, whose works are mainly in Verona, for example, the fresco of Saint George in the Church of St. Anastasia.

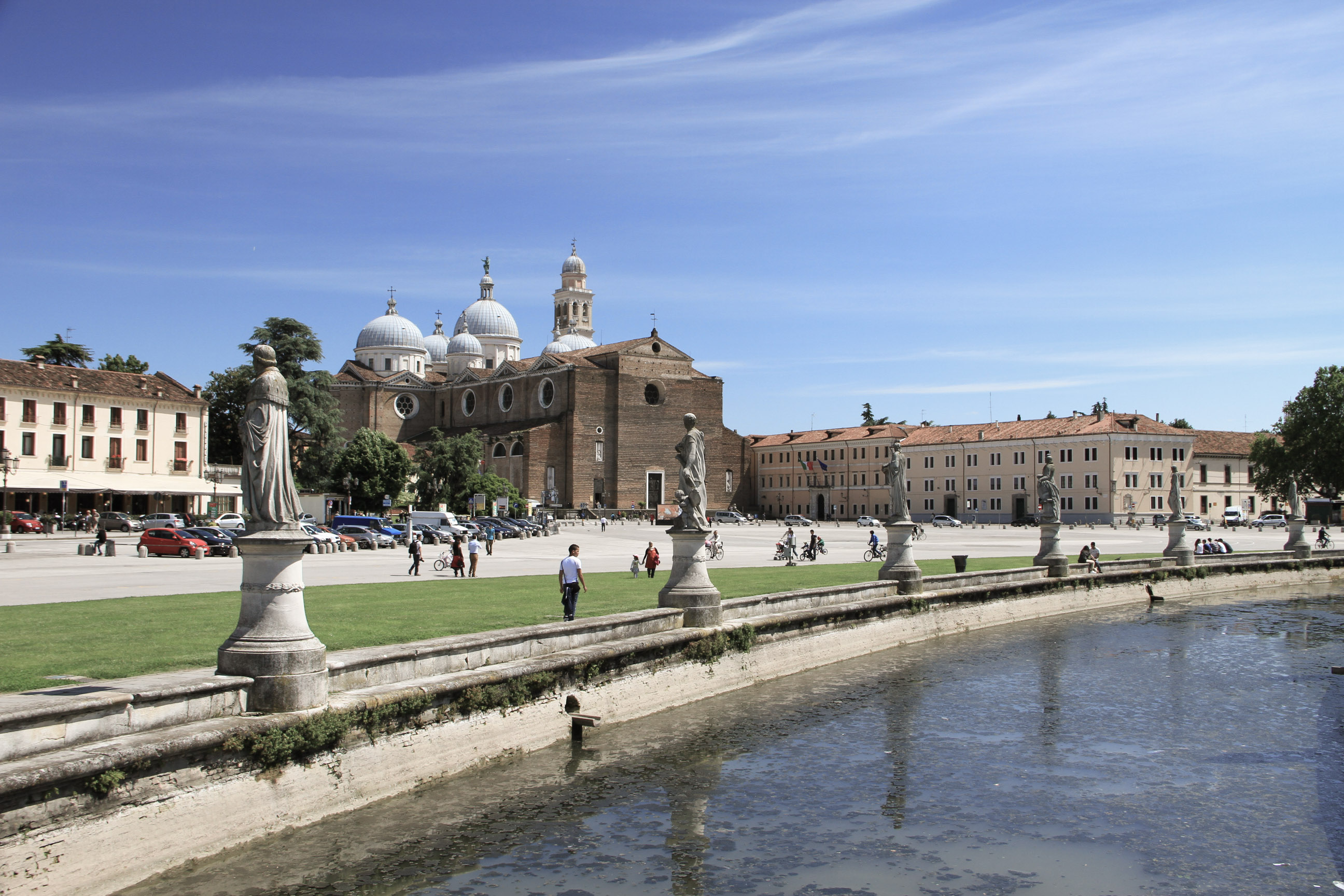
The Prato della Valle in Padua, a work of Italian Renaissance architecture

In the first phase with Carpaccio and Bellini, the influences of international painting were still evident and the references to Flemish art were numerous. Artists of the successive phase included Giorgione, Titian, Sebastiano del Piombo and Lorenzo Lotto. Giorgione and Titian developed an original and innovative style, which characterised the painters of the Venetian school rather than other traditions. Giorgione's enigmatic style infused his work with allegory, and he created his paintings with less reliance on a preparatory drawing than previous painters. This innovation was looking for the imitation of natural phenomena by creating atmospheres with the colours and shifting the emphasis from the pursuit of artistic perfection. The storm (1506–1508), now in the Accademia in Venice, is an example of this use of colour, where the mixture colour and texture continue indefinitely without preparatory drawing for the painting work gives a special atmosphere.

Titian, born in Belluno Pieve di Cadore, brought forward the use of this technique without pictorial design, creating masterpieces such as the Assumption of the Virgin (1516–1518), an altar made by imposing visible sizes on the main altar of the Basilica of Santa Maria Gloriosa dei Frari in Venice, a work whose suggestion is due to the use of colour. At the end of his long life, he had acquired fame and commissions across the continent.

Tintoretto (1518–1594) recast Roman Mannerism in a Venetian style, less linear, and with more use of colour to distinguish forms, highlighting the bright prospects for its operations, giving unusual deformations of perspective, to increase the sense of tension in the work. His studio was prolific. Palaces and churches of Venice abound with his paintings. The Scuola Grande di San Rocco alone sports 66 paintings by this painter. The San Giorgio Maggiore houses a huge canvas by him depicting the Last Supper.

Paolo Veronese (1528–1588) was about as prolific as Tintoretto, with works that celebrated the Venetian state, as well as decorating houses of Venetian nobles. He decorated large portions of the Palazzo Ducale and the decoration of many villas Palladian, including Villa Barbaro.

Jacopo Bassano (1517–1592) and Lorenzo Lotto were active in the mainland, and reflected some of the influences of Milanese painters with the introduction of images taken from real life, enriched by a touch of drama.

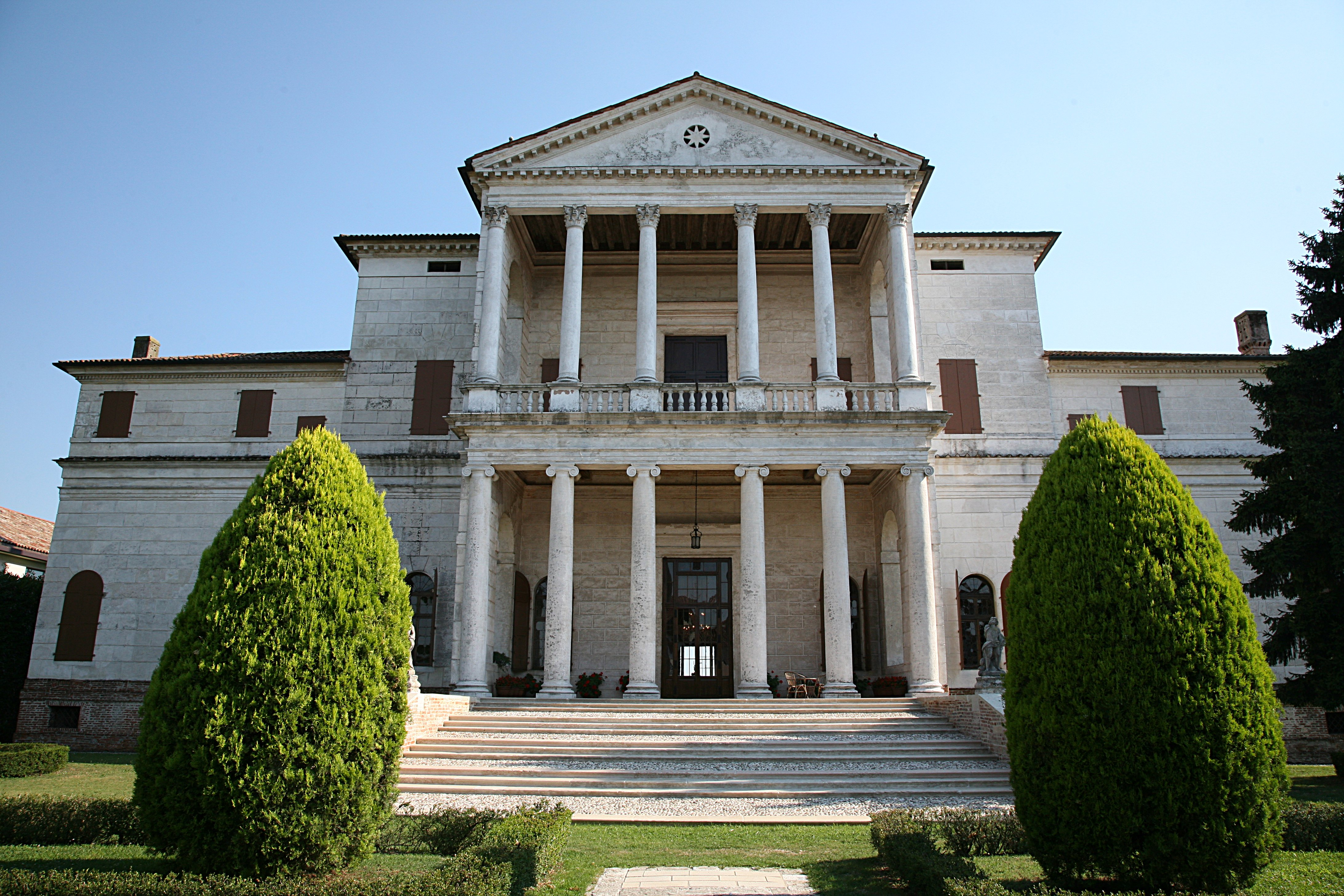
Villa Cornaro

In architecture, Andrea Palladio (1508–1580), born in Padua, completed some highly influential works, including Villas in the mainland, in Vicenza, Padua and Treviso. In Venice, he designed the Basilica of San Giorgio Maggiore, the Il Redentore, and Zitelle on the island of Giudecca. Palladian Villa architecture, in masterpieces such as Villa Emo, Villa Barbaro, Villa Capra, and Villa Foscari, evoked the imagined grandeur of antique classical Roman villas. This aesthetic, through his publications, proved popular and underwent a revival in the neoclassical period. In his villas, the owner shall permit the control over production activities of the surrounding countryside by structuring the functional parts, such as porch, close to the central body. In the case of Villa Badoer, the open barn, formed by a large circular colonnade, enclosing the front yard in front of the villa allows you to create a space that recalls the ancient idea of the Forum Romanum, and bringing all campaign activities to gravitate in front of the villa itself.

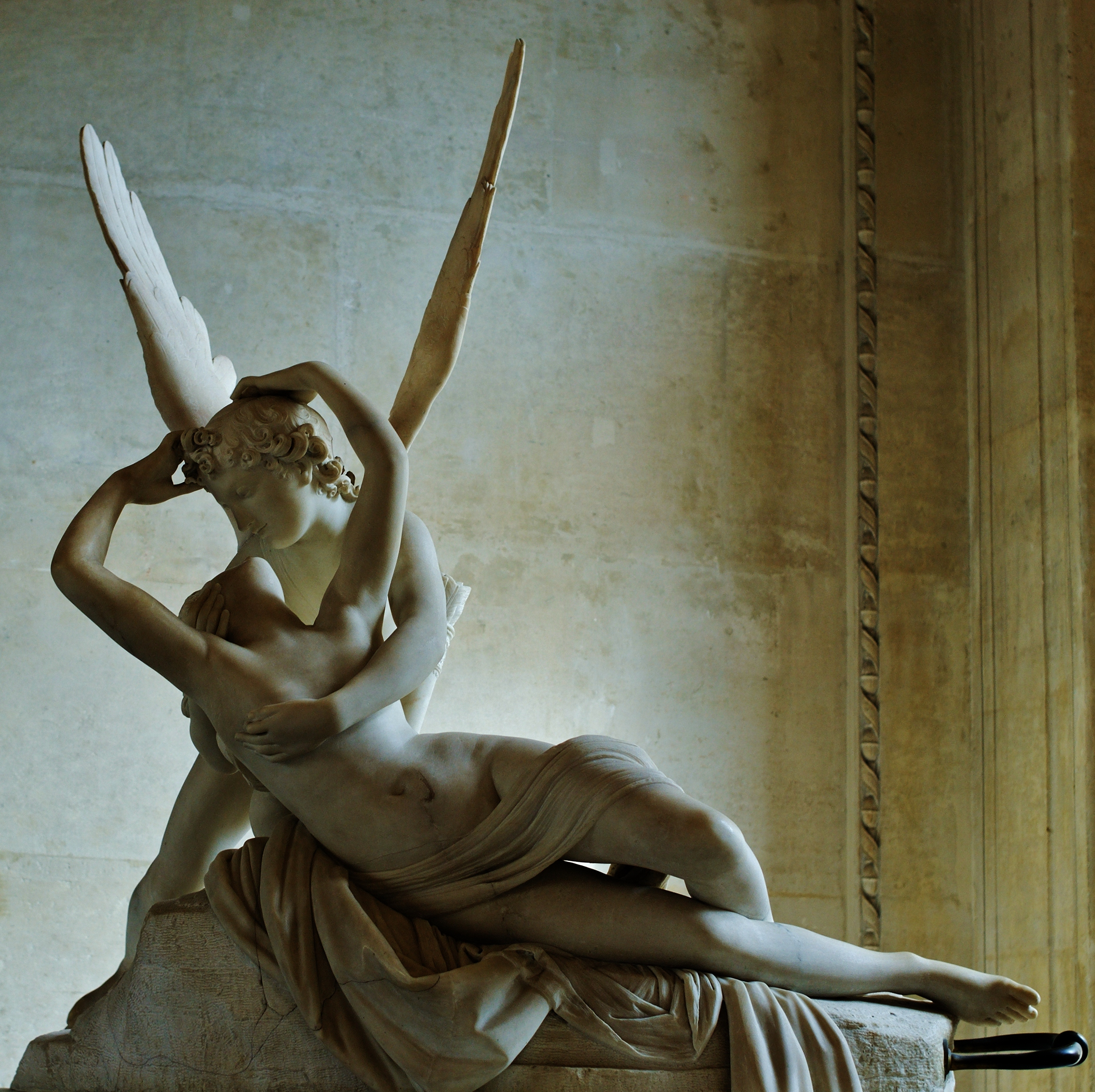
Antonio Canova's Psyche Revived by Love's Kiss

The research style of Palladio has created an architectural movement called Palladianism, which has had strong following in the next three centuries, inspiring architects, some of them his direct students, including Vincenzo Scamozzi, after the death of the teacher who completed several works, including the first Teatro Olimpico in Vicenza.

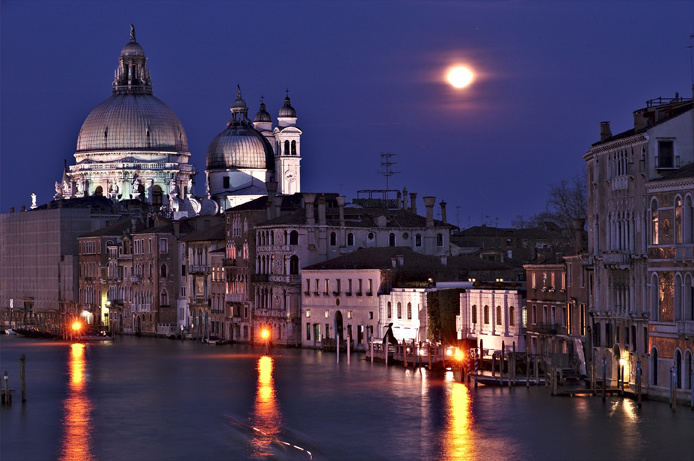
The Church of Santa Maria della Salute in Venice

The 18th-century Venetian school comprises many artists. Important painters include Giambattista Tiepolo, his son Giandomenico, Giambattista Piazzetta, Niccolò Bambini, Pietro Longhi, Marco and Sebastiano Ricci, Sebastiano Bombelli, Gianantonio Fumiani, Gaspare Diziani, Rosalba Carriera, and the architect/painter Girolamo Mengozzi Colonna.

Sculptors include Morlaiter, Filippo Parodi, Bernard Torretti and his nephew Giuseppe Torretti, and at the end of the republic Antonio Canova. Some other important artists are the architects Girolamo Frigimelica Roberti, Giorgio Massari, Scalfarotto, and Tommaso Temanza; the carver Andrea Brustolon; playwrights Carlo Goldoni and Gaspare Gozzi; the poets Alessandro Labia and George Whisker; and composers Benedetto Marcello and Antonio Vivaldi.

Giovanni Battista Tiepolo (1696–1770), described as "the greatest decorative painter of eighteenth-century Europe, as well as its most able craftsman." was a painter and printmaker, who together with Giambattista Pittoni, Canaletto, Giovan Battista Piazzetta, Giuseppe Maria Crespi and Francesco Guardi formed the ultimate group of traditional great Venetian old master painters of that period. Perspective played a central role in Tiepolo's representations, and was forced beyond the usual limits in his ceiling decorations depicting levitating figures viewed from below.

Another peculiar feature of Venetian art is landscape painting, which sees in Canaletto (1697–1768) and Francesco Guardi (1712–1793) the two leading figures. Canaletto's rigorous perspective studies make for an almost "photographic" reality, in contrast to Guardi's more subjective capriccios.

Antonio Canova (1757–1822), born in Possagno, was the greatest of the neoclassical artists. The Temple of Possagno, which he designed, financed, and partly-built himself, is among landmarks of neo-classical architecture. His most important works include Psyche Revived by Love's Kiss and The Three Graces.

After the fall of the Republic of Venice in 1796, every city in Veneto created its own form of art. Important was, however, the role of Accademia di Belle Arti in Venice, who was able to attract many young artists from the surrounding territory.

Among the many artists which were important in modern ages were Guglielmo Ciardi, who incorporated the experience of macchiaioli movement, uniting the typical colour of the classic Venetian school, and yet bringing out from his paintings a chromatic essence, Giacomo Favretto, who too as Ciardi, enhanced the colour, which was sometimes very pronounced, painter Frederick Zandomeneghi, who deviates from the tradition of Venetian colouring to venture in a style similar to French impressionism, and finally Luigi Nono, whose works feel realistic, even if, in addition to painting genre scenes, includes portraits of finity for psychological enhancement.

=== Education ===
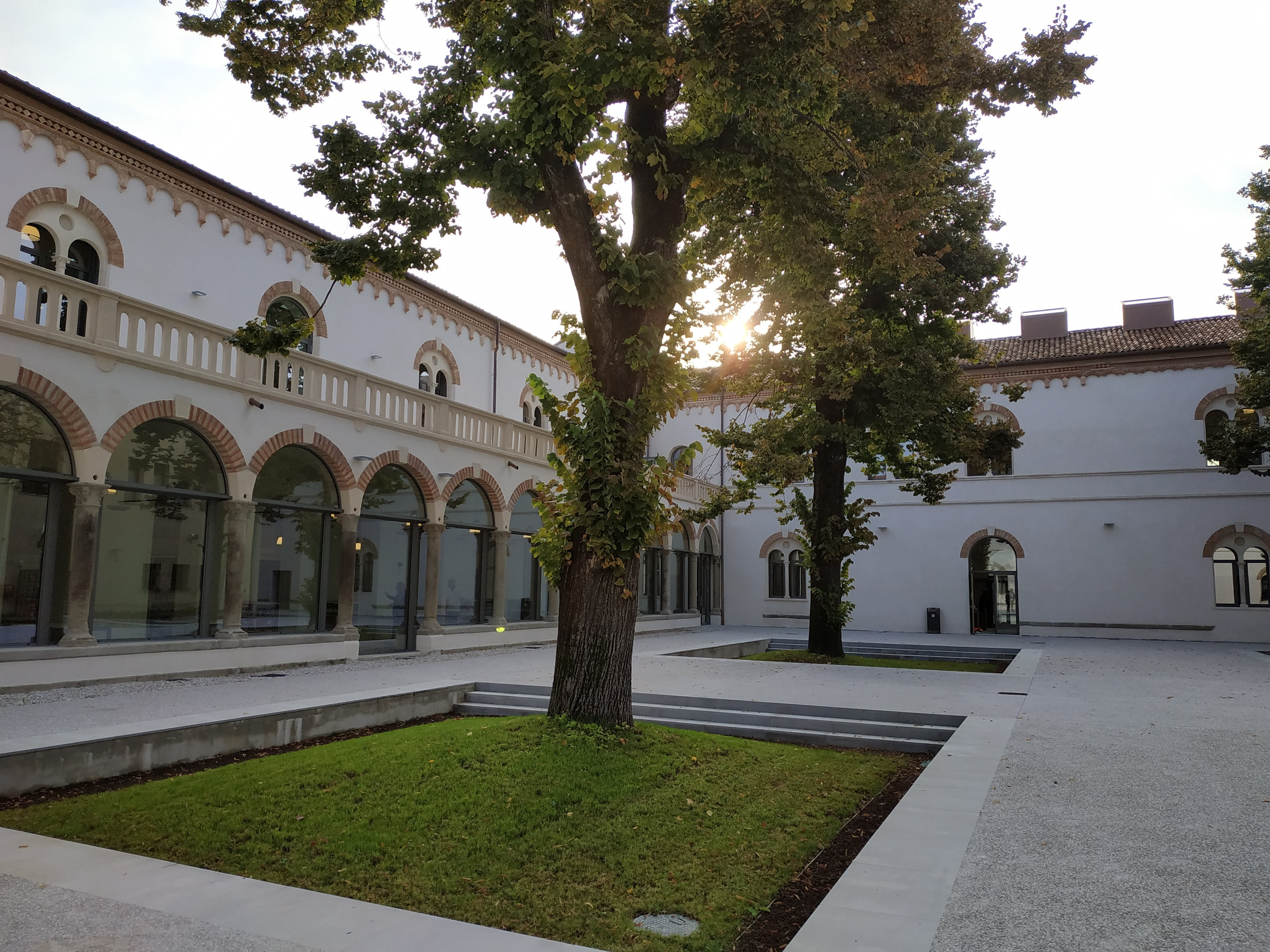
University of Padua, founded in 1222

Veneto hosts one of the oldest universities in the world, the University of Padua, founded in 1222. OECD investigations show that school education achievements in North-Eastern Italy (whose population comes mainly from Veneto) are the highest in Italy. In 2003 the university had approximately 65,000 students.

=== Language ===
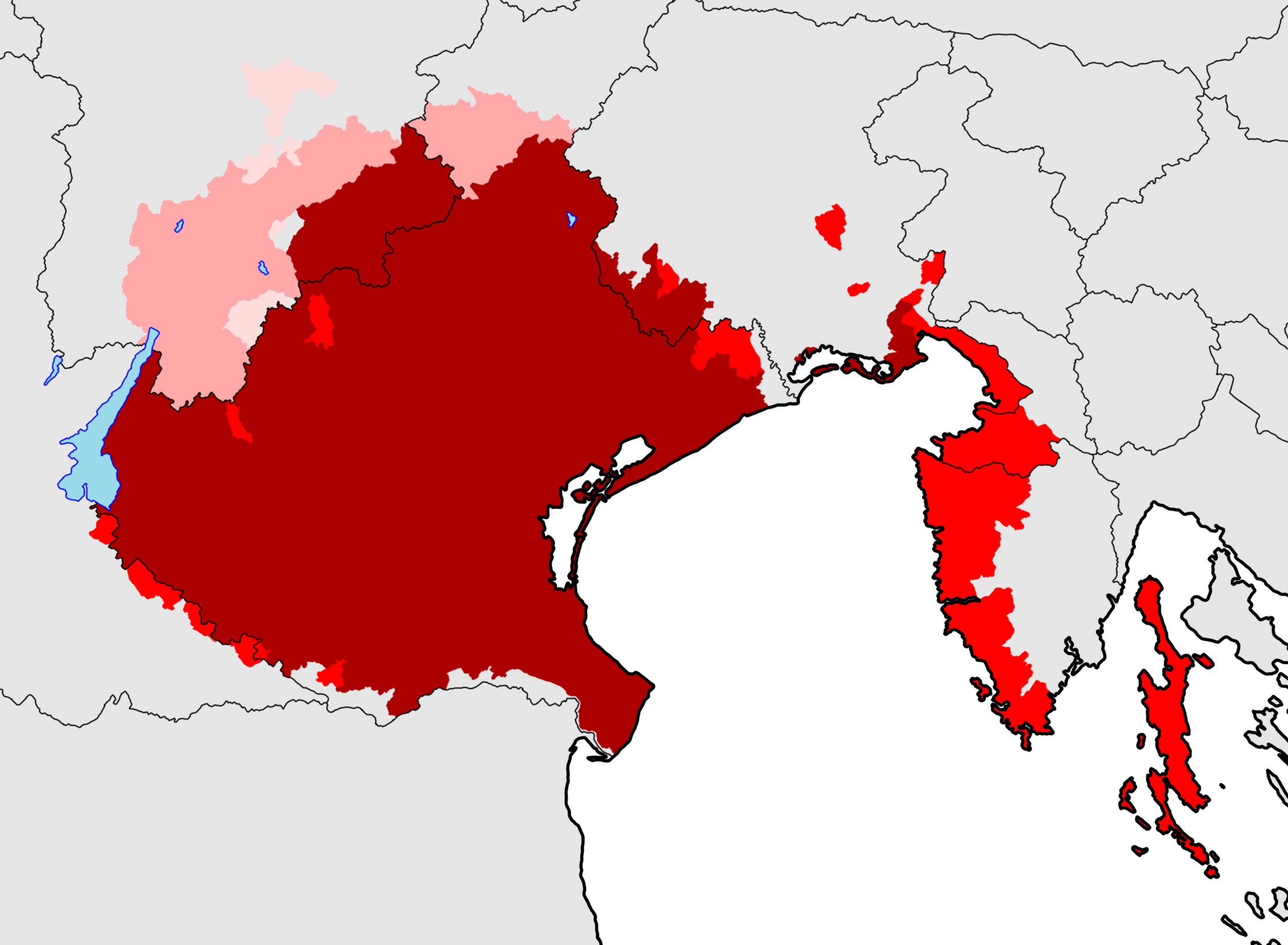
Venetian language distribution in Triveneto: Areas where Venetian is spoken Areas where Venetian is spoken alongside other languages (Bavarian, Emilian, Friulian, Croatian, Slovene, Chakavian, Istriot and formerly Dalmatian) and areas of linguistic transition (with Lombard and with Emilian) Areas of influence of Venetian (over Lombard and over Ladin)

Most of the people of Veneto speak Italian, along with widespread usage of local varieties of the Venetian language. Within Venetian there are distinct sub-groups centered on the major cities, and distinctions are also found between rural and urban dialects and those spoken in northern mountainous areas and on the plain.

Venetian dialects are classified as Western Romance. Linguists identify five major types of Venetian: an Eastern or Coastal (Venice) group, a Central (Padua, Vicenza, Polesine) group, a Western (Verona) group, a North-Central (Treviso) group, and a Northern (Belluno, Feltre, Agordo, Cadore, Zoldo Alto) group of dialects. All dialects are mutually intelligible to varying degrees, are descended from Vulgar Latin and influenced to varying degrees by Italian. Venetian is first attested as a written language in the 13th century. It is also spoken outside of Veneto, such as in Friuli-Venezia Giulia (including in Trieste, see Triestine dialect), Istria in Croatia and Slovenia and Dalmatia in Croatia, Brazil (Talian dialect) and Mexico (Chipilo Venetian dialect).

The language of Venice enjoyed substantial prestige in the days of the Venetian Republic, when it attained the status of a lingua franca in the Mediterranean. Notable Venetian-language authors include the playwrights Carlo Goldoni (1707–1793) and Carlo Gozzi (1720–1806), while Ruzante (1502–1542) is best known for his rustic comedies "cast in mainland peasant Pavan 'Paduan'".

Ladin, also Romance, is spoken in parts of the province of Belluno, especially in the municipalities of Cortina d'Ampezzo, Livinallongo del Col di Lana and Colle Santa Lucia, while Cimbrian (Germanic) is spoken in two villages (Roana and Giazza respectively) of the Seven Communities and the Thirteen Communities. These are two historical groups of villages of Cimbric origin, which for a long time formed two distinct "commonwealths" under the rule of the Republic of Venice, among others. Furthermore, in the area around Portogruaro people speak Friulian.

As the region does not enjoy a special status of autonomy, minority languages are not granted any form of official recognition. A motion to recognise Venetian as an official regional language has been approved by the regional Parliament.

=== Literature ===
Venetian literature, referring to works written in the Venetian language, experienced an initial period of splendour in the 16th century with the success of artists such as Ruzante. It then reached its zenith in the 18th century, thanks especially to dramatist Carlo Goldoni. Subsequently, literary production in Venetian declined, following the collapse of the Republic of Venice. Nevertheless, during the 20th century there was a literary revival featuring lyrical poets such as Biagio Marin of Grado.

=== Cuisine ===
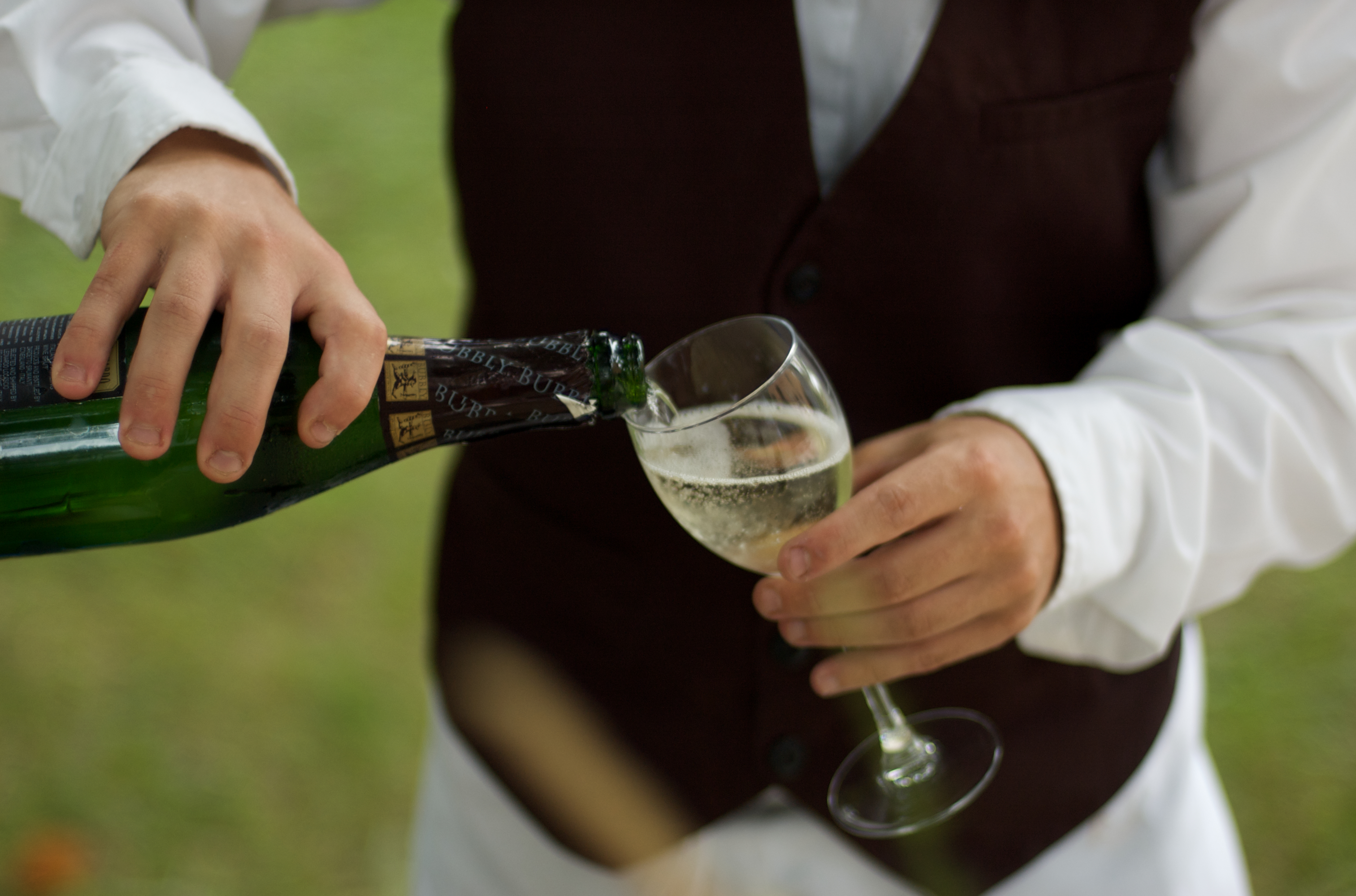
Waiter pouring Prosecco

Cuisine is an important part of the culture of Veneto, and the region is home to some of the most recognisable dishes, desserts and wines in Italian, European and worldwide cuisine.

==== Wines and drinks ====
Veneto is an important wine-growing area producing: Soave, Bardolino, Recioto, Amarone, Torcolato, Prosecco, Tocai Rosso, Garganega, Valpolicella, Verduzzo, Raboso, Moscato, Cabernet Franc, Pinot Nero, Pinot Grigio, and Merlot. Homemade wine making is widespread. After making wine, the alcohol of the pressed grapes is distilled to produce grappa or graspa, as it is called in the local language.

Prosecco is a dry sparkling wine. It is made from the glera grape, a white grape formerly known as Prosecco, which is traditionally grown in an area near Conegliano and Valdobbiadene, in the hills north of Treviso. The name of Prosecco is derived from the northern Italian village of Prosecco (Trieste), where this grape variety is believed to have originated.

Spritz, in the Venetian language also called "spriss" or "spriseto" depending on the area, usually consists of equal parts of sparkling wine, Aperol and sparkling water. Campari may also be used instead of Aperol.

==== Cheeses ====
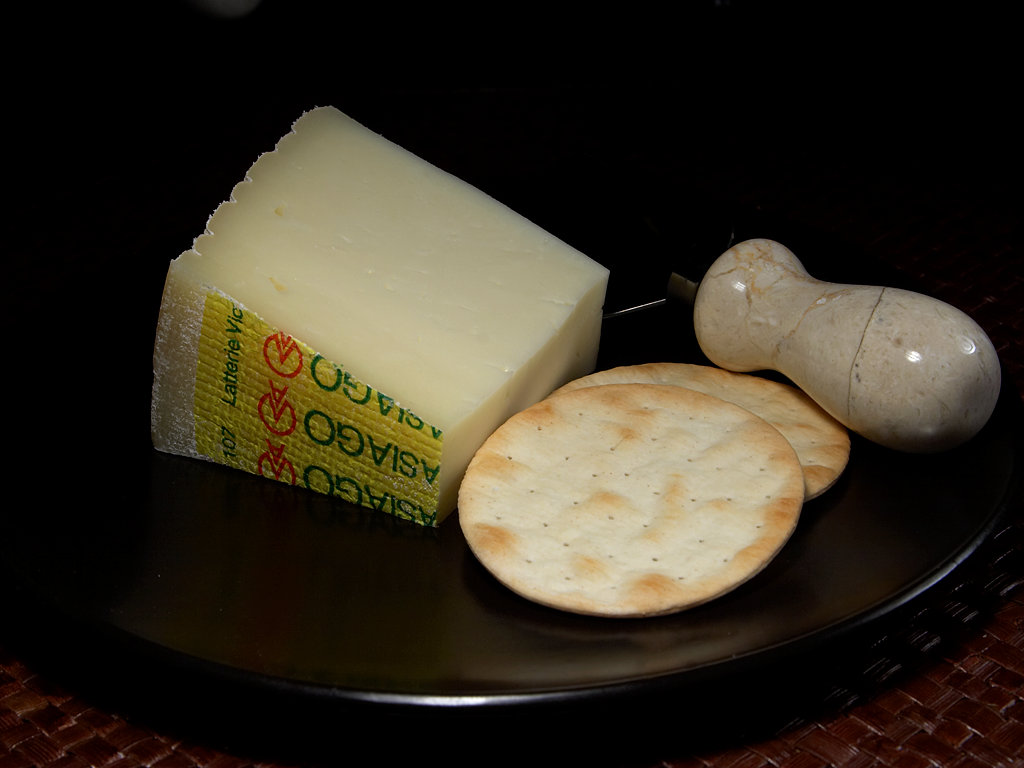
Asiago cheese and crackers

Cheeses of Veneto include: Asiago (PDO), Piave (PDO), Monte Veronese (PDO), Morlacco, Grana Padano (PDO).

==== Salamis and meats ====
The sopressa vicentina (PDO) is an aged salami, cylindrical in shape and prepared with raw, quality pork meat. It may or may not include garlic in its ingredients and comes in medium and large sizes. Prosciutto Veneto Berico-Euganeo (PDO) is obtained from the fresh meat of a top breed of adult hogs. The aroma is delicate, sweet and fragrant.

==== Vegetables ====
Radicchio rosso di Treviso (PGI) is a peculiar vegetable with a faintly bitter taste and a crunchy texture. The production area encompasses many town districts in the provinces of Treviso, Padua and Venice. The radicchio Variegato di Castelfranco (PGI) has a delicate and slightly sweet taste and a crunchy texture. Veronese Vialone Nano Rice from Verona (PGI) is a type of rice with short, plump grains, which have a creamy consistency when cooked. They are commonly used in risotto dishes and have a high starch content. The Bean of Lamon (PGI) is particularly prized for its delicate flavour and extremely tender skin. The White Asparagus of Cimadolmo (PGI) has a peculiar scent and a very delicate taste. The White Asparagus of Bassano is a typical product of the northern part of the province of Vicenza. The San Zeno di Montagna (Verona) chestnut has Protected Geographical Status.

==== Desserts ====
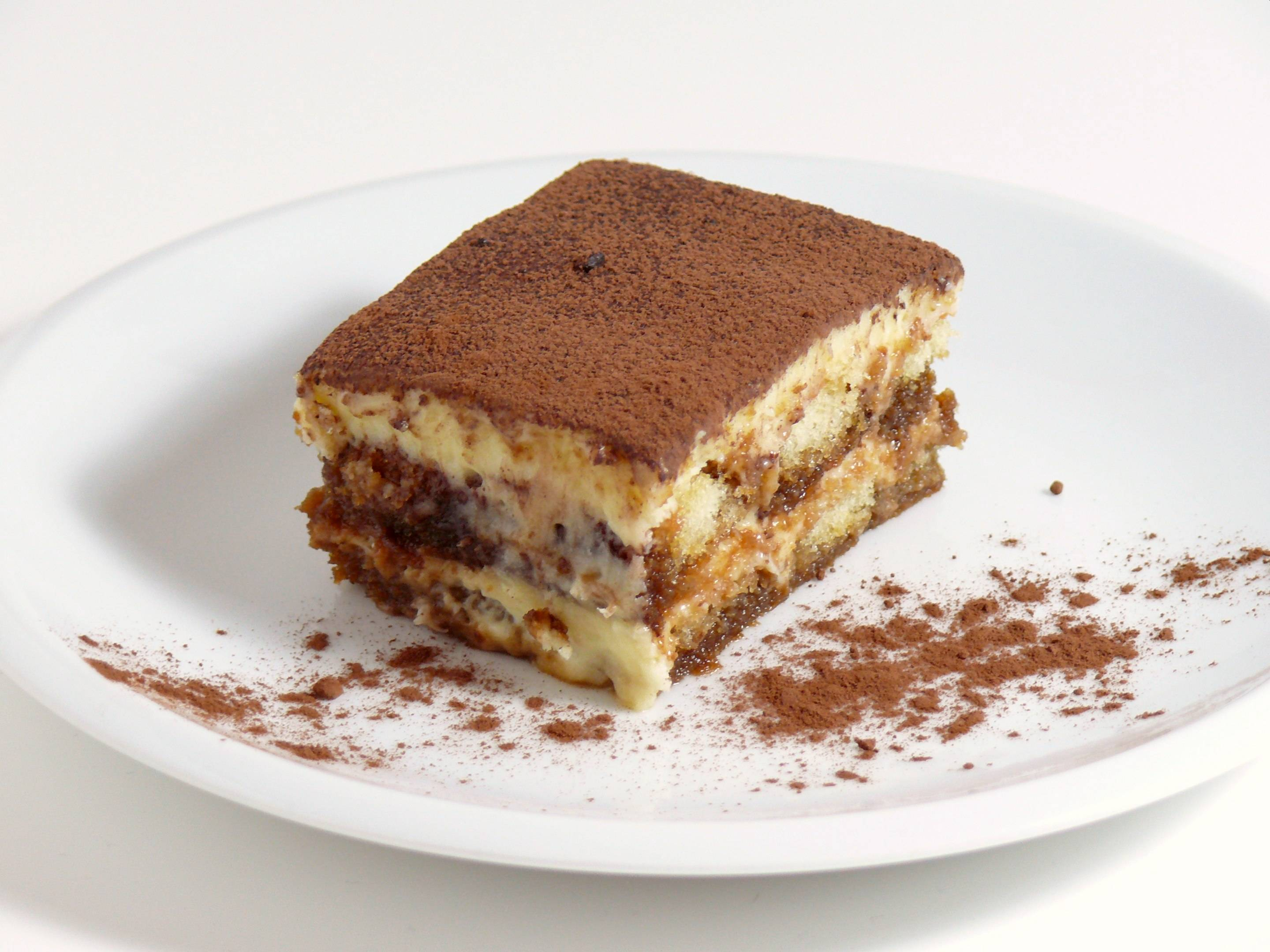
A slice of tiramisù

Tiramisù (a dessert made from mascarpone, coffee, Marsala wine, savoiardi and chocolate) originates from Veneto.

=== Festivals ===
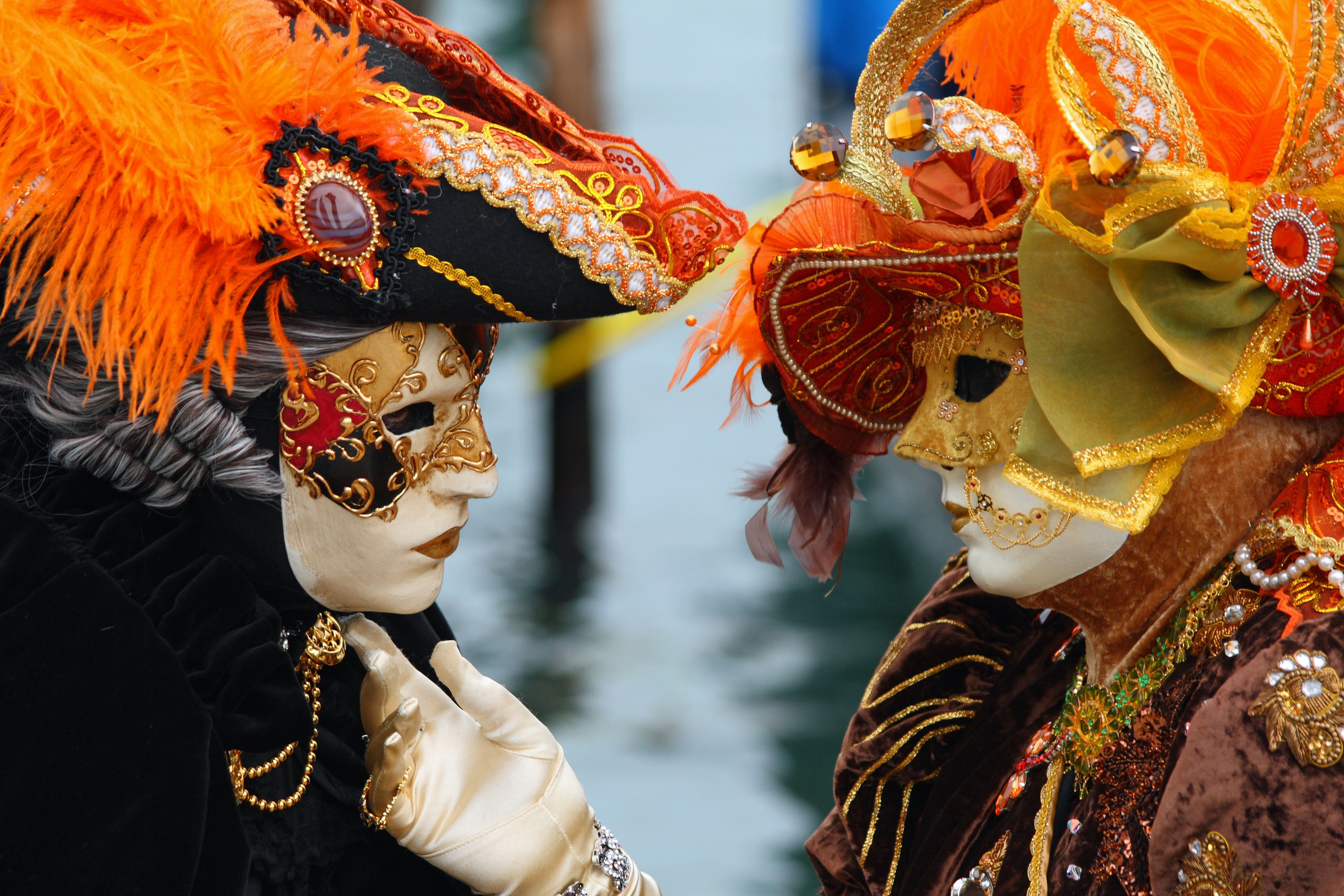
The Carnival of Venice tradition is most famous for its distinctive masks.

Each town, often every quarter, has its patron saint whose feast day is solemnly celebrated. Many other festivals are closely linked to the religious calendar. Among these:

- Carnival of Venice celebrated the Tuesday before Ash Wednesday;
- Panevin celebrated around Epiphany;
- Pasqua (Easter Sunday);
- Saint Mark's feast day (25 April);
- La Sensa (Ascension Thursday);
- San Giovanni Battista (24 June);
- La festa del Redentór (mid July);
- Vendemmia (grape harvest in September);
- San Nicolò de Bari (St. Nicholas, 6 December);
- Nadàl (Christmas)

=== Music ===
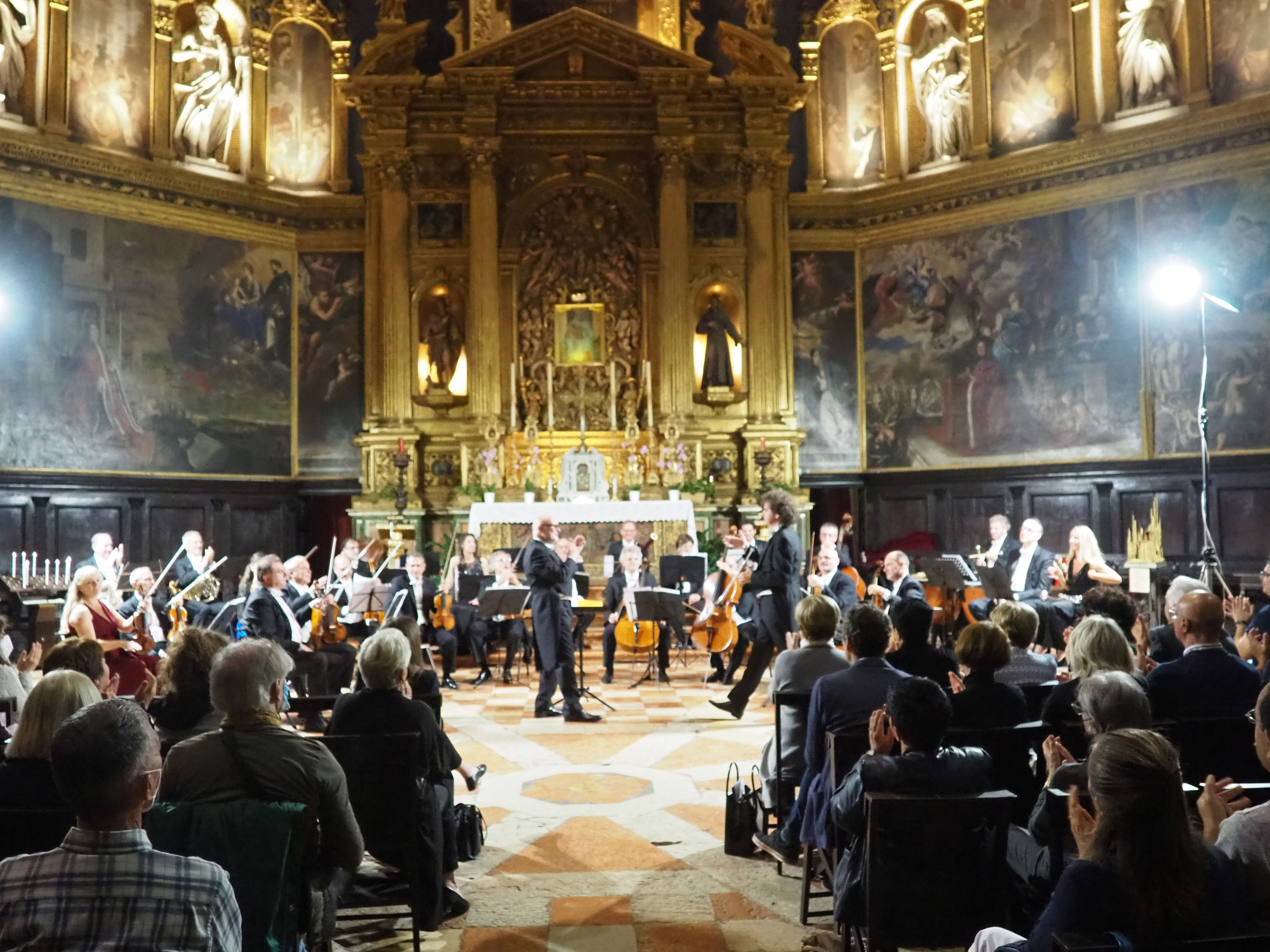
Rovigo, chiesa della Beata Vergine del Soccorso, named La Rotonda, 27 september 2022: Giuliano Carella conducted the orchestra I Solisti Veneti in La tromba, regina degli ottoni (The trumpet, queen of the brass).

The city of Venice in Italy has played an important role in the development of the music of Italy. The Venetian state—i.e. the medieval Maritime Republic of Venice—was often popularly called the "Republic of Music", and an anonymous Frenchman of the 17th century is said to have remarked that "In every home, someone is playing a musical instrument or singing. There is music everywhere."

In Padua, musical ensembles such as the Amici della Musica di Padova, the Solisti Veneti and the Padova-Veneto Symphony are found. Concerts are often held in the historic Loggia Comaro, built in 1524. As well, the city is the site of the Teatro delle Maddalene, the Teatro delle Grazie, the Giuseppe Verdi Theater, and the Cesare Pollini music conservatory.

Rovigo is the site of the Teatro Sociale, built in 1819. In the 20th century it was the venue for the career beginnings of Tullio Serafin, Beniamino Gigli and Renata Tebaldi. The town of Rovigo is also the site of the Francesco Venezze music Conservatory.

The city of Verona is the site of the Roman amphitheatre known as the "Arena" which has been hosting musical events since the 16th century, but more recently the spectacular outdoor staging of Verdi's Aida, an event staged for the first time in 1913. The city also has the Felice Evaristo Dall'Abaco music conservatory;

==== Musicians and composers ====
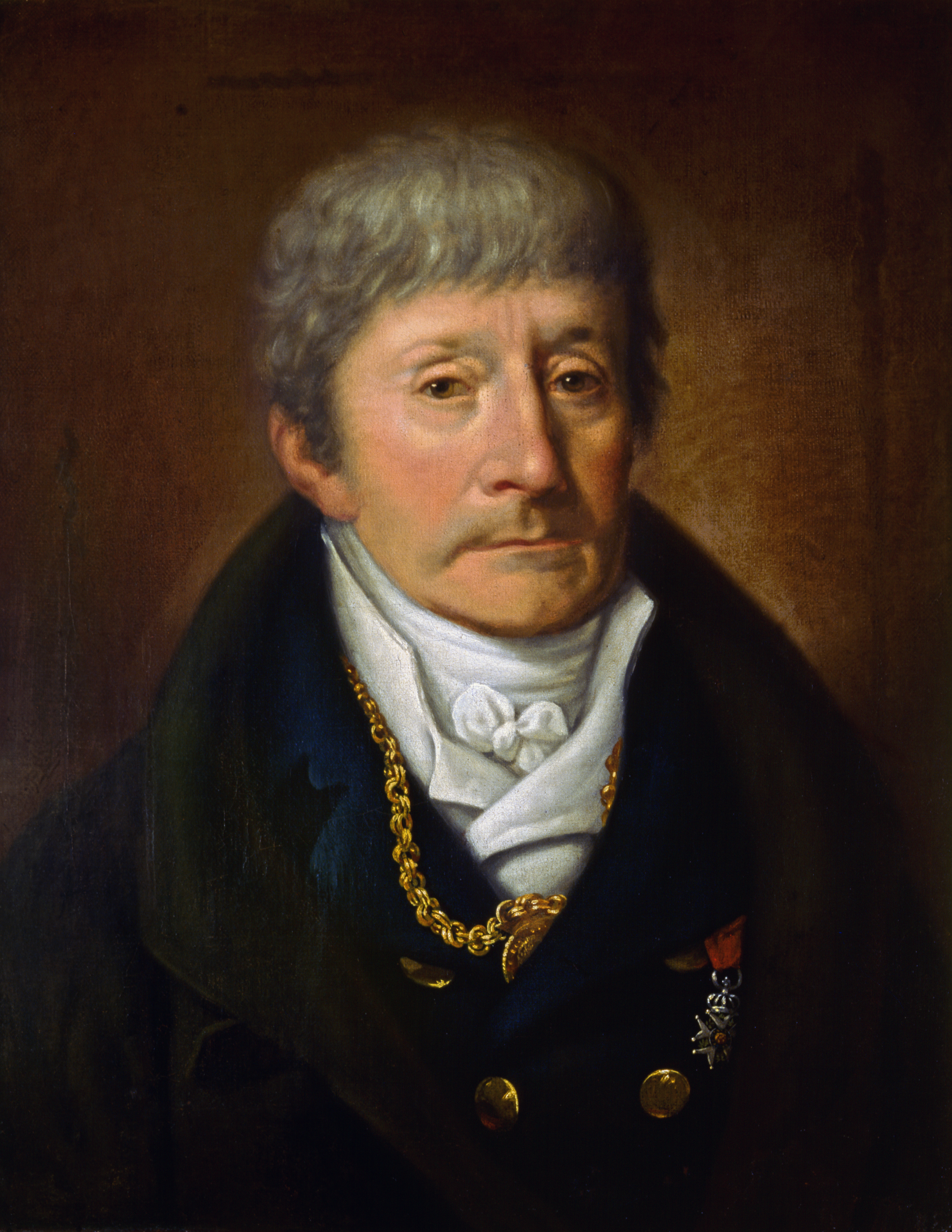
Antonio Salieri

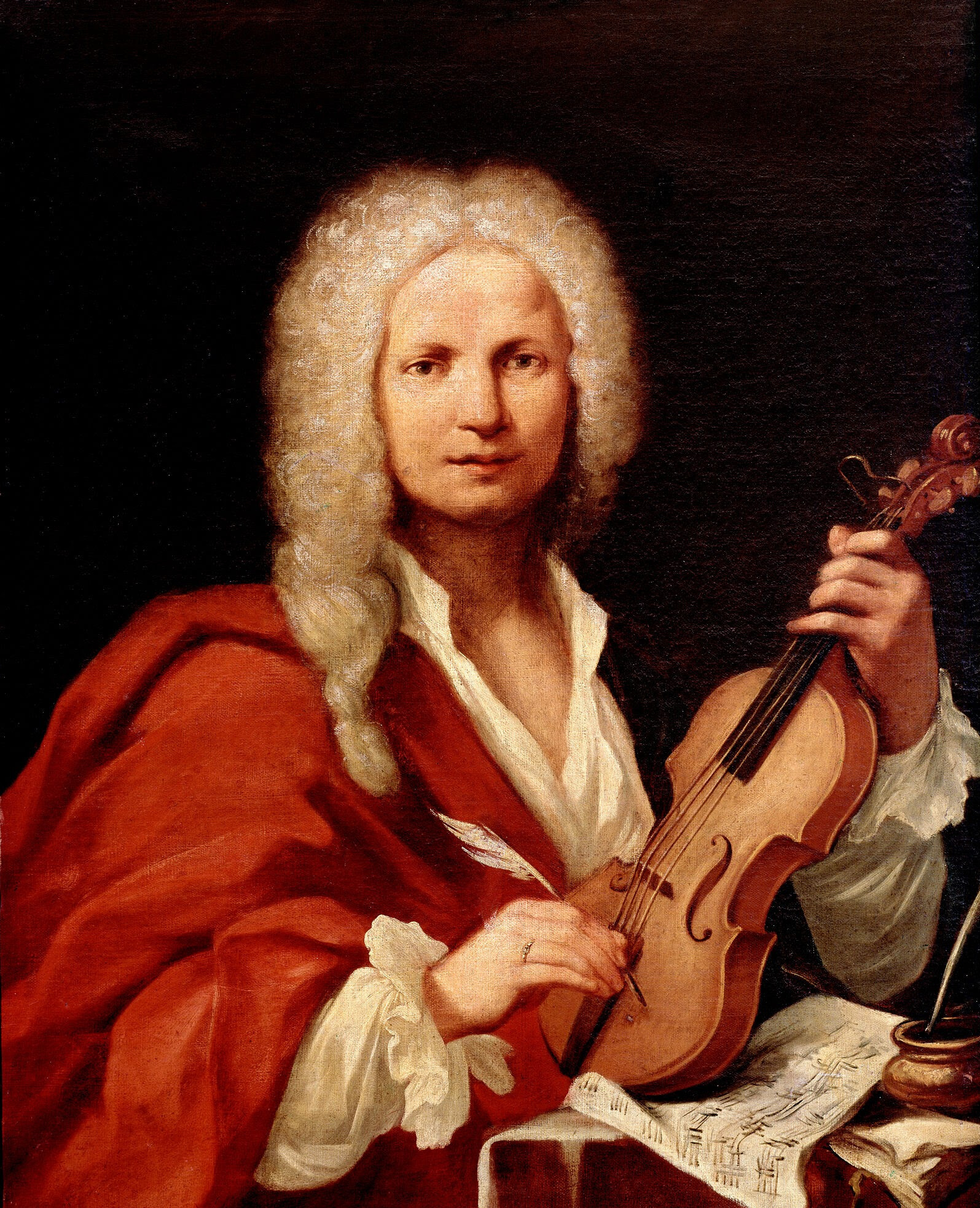
Antonio Vivaldi

- Claudio Monteverdi (1567–1643), composer, opera pioneer, and director of music at San Marco
- Alessandro Marcello (1669–1747) was a nobleman, poet, philosopher, mathematician and musician.
- Tomaso Albinoni (1671–1751) was a composer and violinist of the Baroque period.
- Antonio Vivaldi (1678–1741) was a violinist and composer of Baroque music.
- Benedetto Marcello (1686–1739) was a composer, writer, advocate, magistrate, and teacher.
- Baldassare Galuppi (1706–1785) was a composer and organist.
- Antonio Salieri (1750–1825) was a conductor and composer of sacred, classical and opera music.
- Mario Brunello (1960 – ) is a renowned worldwide cellist and musician.
- Jacopo Foroni a Venetian musician from Valeggio sul Mincio, in the province of Verona.
- Luigi Nono (1924–1990) was a contemporary music composer.
- Giuseppe Sinopoli (1946–2001) was a conductor, composer and Italian essayist.
- Rondo Veneziano are an Italian musical ensemble that mixes Baroque music with pop music and rock.

See also

==== Theatres ====
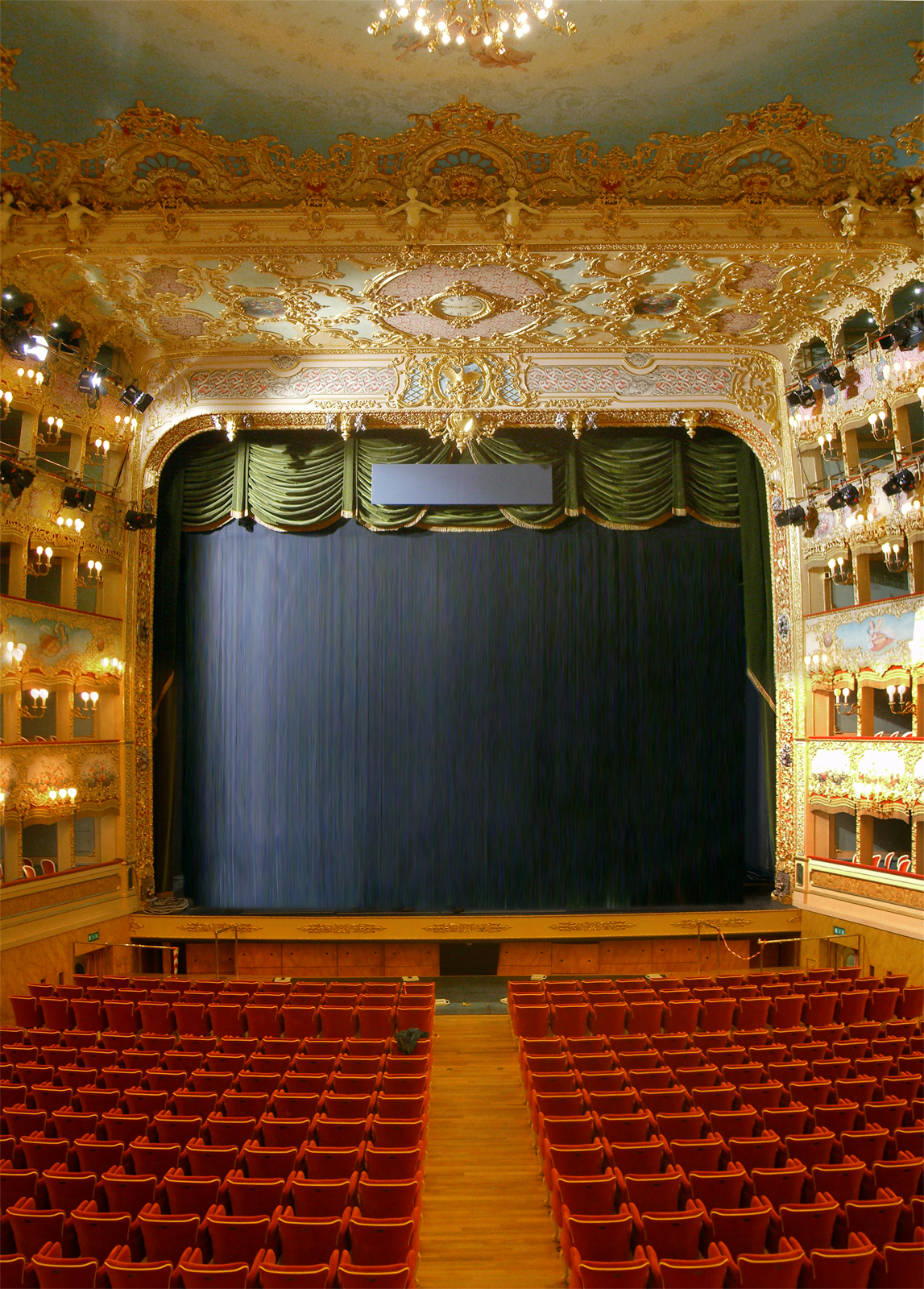
Teatro La Fenice

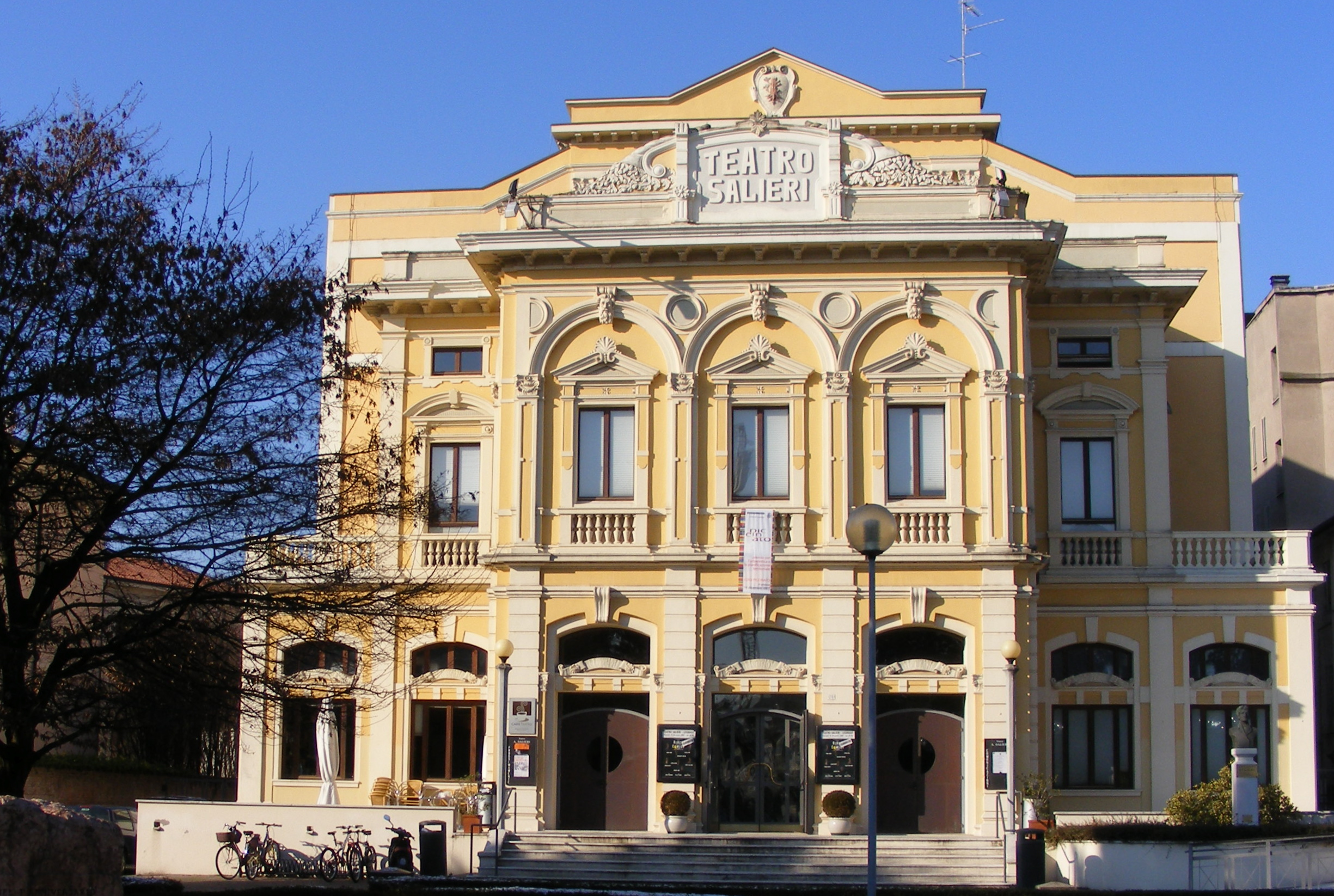
Teatro Salieri

- Teatro La Fenice is the main opera house of Venice. Repeatedly destroyed by fire and later rebuilt, it is home to an important opera season and to the International Festival of contemporary music. Teatro La Fenice in Venice was designed in 1790 by Gian Antonio Selva for the society of the Venetian artistocracy, and the Venetian Theatre was built rapidly despite the many controversies about its location and its rational structure and neoclassical style.
- Teatro Malibran is a Venetian theatre. In the 17th and 18th centuries it bore the name of Theater St. John Chrysostom.
- Teatro Stabile del Veneto "Carlo Goldoni" corresponds to the ancient Teatro Vendramin, also known as San Salvador or San Luke, and was opened in 1622. The Teatro Carlo Goldoni is located in the vicinity of the Rialto bridge, in the historical centre of Venice. It is a film set, with rooms structured in four tiers of boxes, stalls and galleries. With a total of 800 seats, the stage is off 12 Underground and 11.20 deep and is framed in iron. The Teatro Goldoni season hosts Prose organised by the Teatro Stabile del Veneto "Carlo Goldoni", the review of Children's Theatre, opera, concerts, ballets and other events in the concession.
- Teatro Verdi (Padua) is the main theatre in Padua. Commissioned by a society formed specifically for the purpose of establishing a major theatre in the city, it was built by the Paduan architect Giovanni Gloria (c. 1684–1753) to designs by Antonio Cugini (1677–1765), an architect from Reggio Emilia. It opened in 1751, and was known as the Teatro Nuovo until 1884. Substantial restoration work was carried out in 1847, 1884 and 1920. Currently the Teatro Verdi is the operational headquarters of the Teatro Stabile del Veneto.
- Teatro Olimpico is a theatre designed by the Renaissance architect Andrea Palladio in 1580 and located in Vicenza. It is generally considered the first example of a modern indoor theatre set. The realisation of the theatre, in a pre-existing medieval complex, was commissioned by the Olympic Palladio for the staging of classical plays. Its construction began in 1580 and was inaugurated on 3 March 1585, after the realisation of the stationery scenes of Vincenzo Scamozzi. These wooden structures are the only of the Renaissance to be extant, however, they are still excellent condition. The theatre is still the seat of performances and concerts and has been included in 1994 in the list of World Heritage Sites' s UNESCO, as other works by Palladio to Vicenza.
- Philharmonic Theater (Verona) is the main opera house of Verona. It is owned by the Accademia Filarmonica di Verona, since its foundation, but is used by the foundation of the Arena as the site of the opera season in winter.
- Teatro Filarmonico in Verona (built in the XVIII century)
- Roman Theatre of Verona is Verona's main arena, located in the northern part of the city at the foot of Colle San Pietro. This theatre was built at the end of BC, a period in which Verona has seen from the monumental St. Peter of the hill. Before, it was built between the Stone Bridge and Gates of the embankments, which were built on Tyrol parallel to the theatre itself, in order to defend against the possible flooding of river. It is considered the largest Roman theatre in the north of Italy. Today it is used for theatrical and operatic productions during the summer.
- Teatro Salieri in Legnago, Verona

== Tourism ==
=== Cities ===
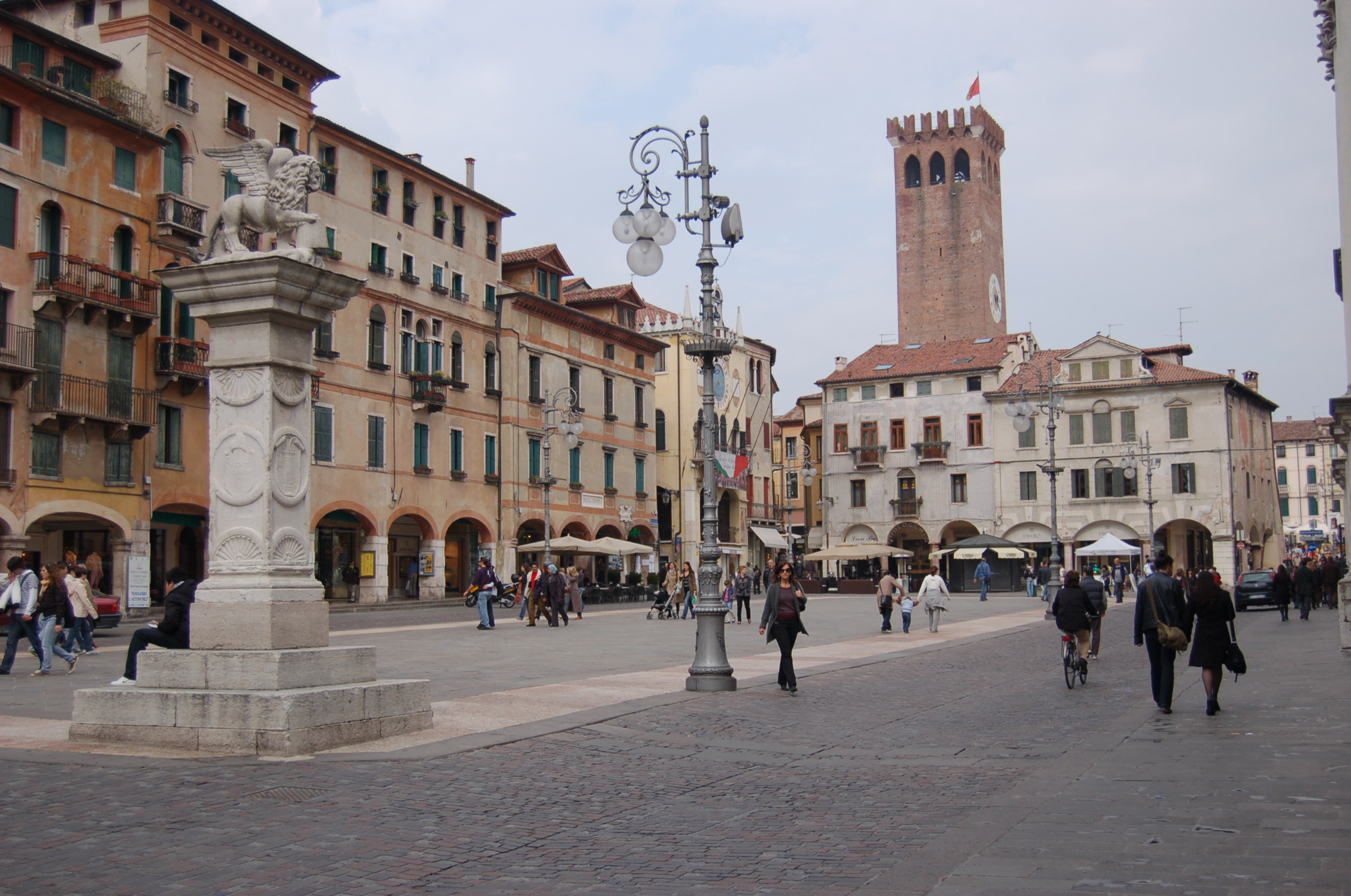
Piazza Libertà in Bassano del Grappa with the Lion of Saint Mark

- Venice: Venice and its lagoon are listed as World Heritage Sites by UNESCO.
- Padua: also known as the "City of the Saint"; the Orto botanico di Padova and its Fourteenth Century Frescoes are on UNESCO's list of World Heritage Sites.
- Verona: The city of Shakespeare's lovers: Romeo and Juliet. Verona has been named a UNESCO world heritage site.
- Vicenza is on UNESCO's list of World Heritage Sites, together with a number of the Palladian Villas.
- Treviso: the city of tiramisu, frescoes and canals.
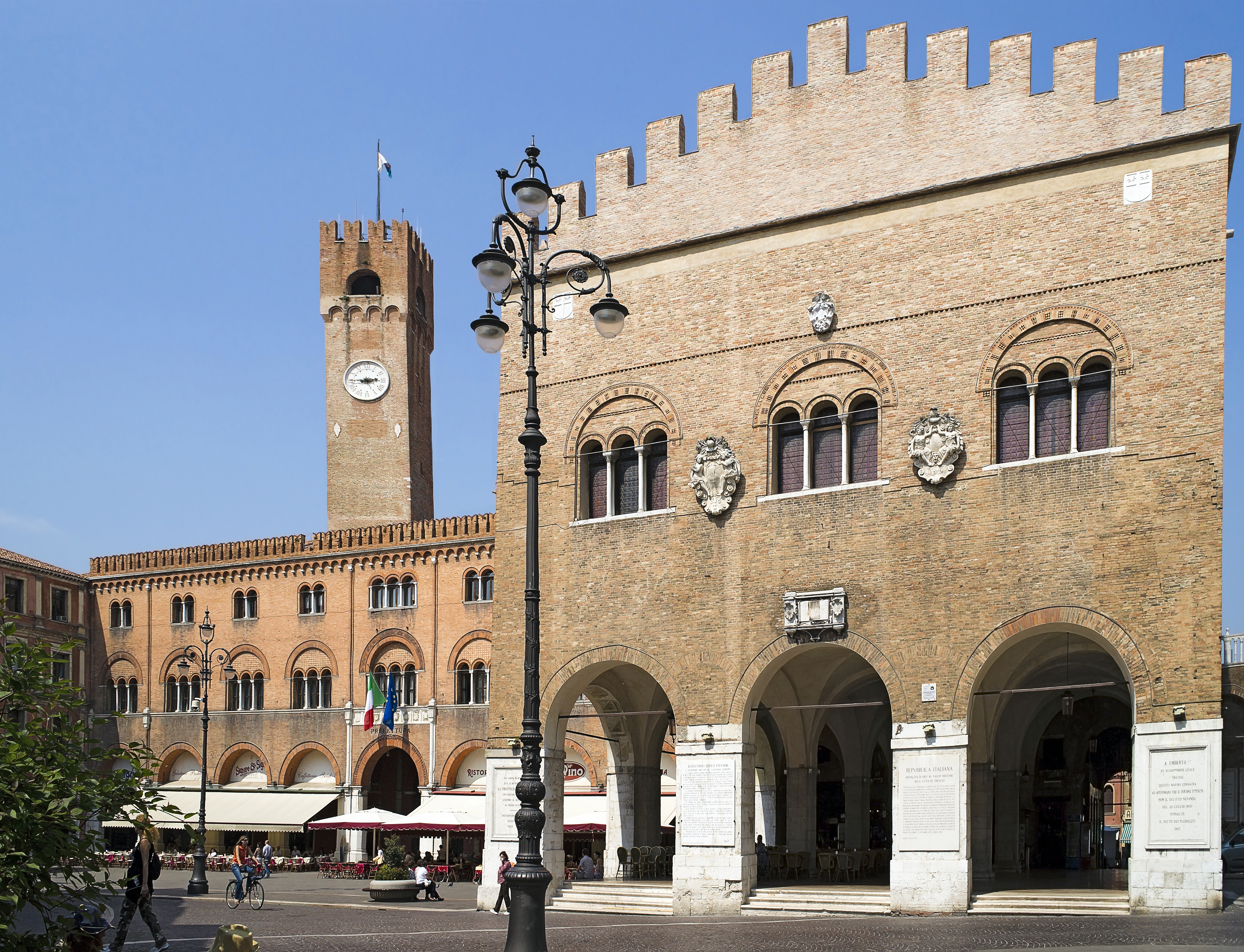
- Piazza dei Signori and Palazzo dei Trecento of Treviso
  Belluno the capital of the Dolomites, the bell tower was designed by Filippo Juvarra.
- Montagnana is a municipality in the province of Padova with perfectly conserved medieval walls.
- Bassano del Grappa with its Ponte degli Alpini on the river Brenta, designed in 1569 by Andrea Palladio.
- Marostica: The 'Chess Game' is the most important event of the town, taking place on the second weekend of September, involves over 550 participants and lasts two hours.
- Asolo is known as 'The Pearl of province of Treviso', and also as 'The City of a Hundred Horizons'.
- Este: The House of Este held the city until 1240, when they moved their capital to Ferrara.
- Arquà Petrarca: this village on the Euganean hills features the tomb and house of Francesco Petrarca, one of the most important Italian poets of the 14th century.

=== UNESCO World Heritage Sites ===
UNESCO World Heritage Sites
Name and description	Image
L'Orto Botanico di Padova Inserted by UNESCO in 1997. It is the world's oldest academic botanical garden that is still in its original location. (Officially, the oldest university botanical garden is the Orto botanico di Pisa, which was founded in 1544; however, that garden was relocated twice and has only occupied its current, and now-permanent, location since 1591.) It is located in Padua, Italy and was founded in 1545. The garden, affiliated with the University of Padua, currently covers roughly 22,000 square metres (240,000 square feet) and has special collections.	Orto Botanico di Padova
Padua's Fourteenth Century Frescoes They have been added in 2021. They are Padua's second world heritage site.
Verona Verona was inscribed in the year 2000. One of the seven provincial capitals in the region. It is one of the main tourist destinations in north-eastern Italy, thanks to its artistic heritage, several annual fairs, shows and operas, such as the lyrical season in the Arena, the ancient amphitheatre built by the Romans.	Ponte Pietra, Verona
City of Vicenza and the Palladian Villas of the Veneto The city of Vicenza and the Palladian Villas of Veneto were inscribed in 1994 (extended in 1996). Vicenza is a thriving and cosmopolitan city, with a rich history and culture, and many museums, art galleries, piazzas, villas, churches and elegant, Renaissance palazzi. The Palladian Villas of Veneto, in the surrounding area, and the renowned Teatro Olimpico (Olympic Theatre) have both been enlisted as UNESCO World Heritage Sites since 1994 (extended in 1996).	The Palazzo Chiericati in Vicenza
Venice and its Lagoon The city and its lagoon were inscribed in 1987. With a population of 271,367 (census estimate 1 January 2004). Together with Padua, the city is included in the Padua-Venice Metropolitan Area (population 1,600,000). The city historically was the capital of an independent nation. Venice has been known as the "La Dominante", "Serenissima", "Queen of the Adriatic", "City of Water", "City of Bridges", "City of Canals" and "The City of Light". Luigi Barzini, writing in The New York Times, described it as "undoubtedly the most beautiful city built by man". Venice has also been described by the Times Online as being one of Europe's most romantic cities.	San Giorgio Maggiore, Venice
Dolomites They were inscribed in 2009. They are located for the most part in the province of Belluno, the rest in South Tyrol and Trentino (all in north-eastern Italy). Conventionally they extend from the Adige river in the west to the Piave valley (Pieve di Cadore) in the east. The northern and southern borders are defined by the Puster Valley and the Sugana Valley (Val Sugana). But the Dolomites spread also over the Piave river (Dolomiti d'Oltrepiave) to the east; and far away over the Adige river to the west is the Brenta Group (Western Dolomites); there is also another smaller group called Piccole Dolomiti (Small Dolomites) located between the Provinces of Trento and Vicenza (see the map).	Il Pomagagnon
Peschiera del Garda The town is encircled by massive Venetian defensive systems that are a UNESCO World Heritage Site since 9 July 2017.	Porta Verona
Prosecco Hills of Conegliano and Valdobbiadene It was added to the Unesco list in 2019.	Prosecco Hill in Conegliano
Pile Dwellings Sites Found in the province of Verona, one near Peschiera del Garda and one at Tombolo. There is also one in the province of Padua at Arquà Petrarca

=== Palladian Villas of Veneto ===
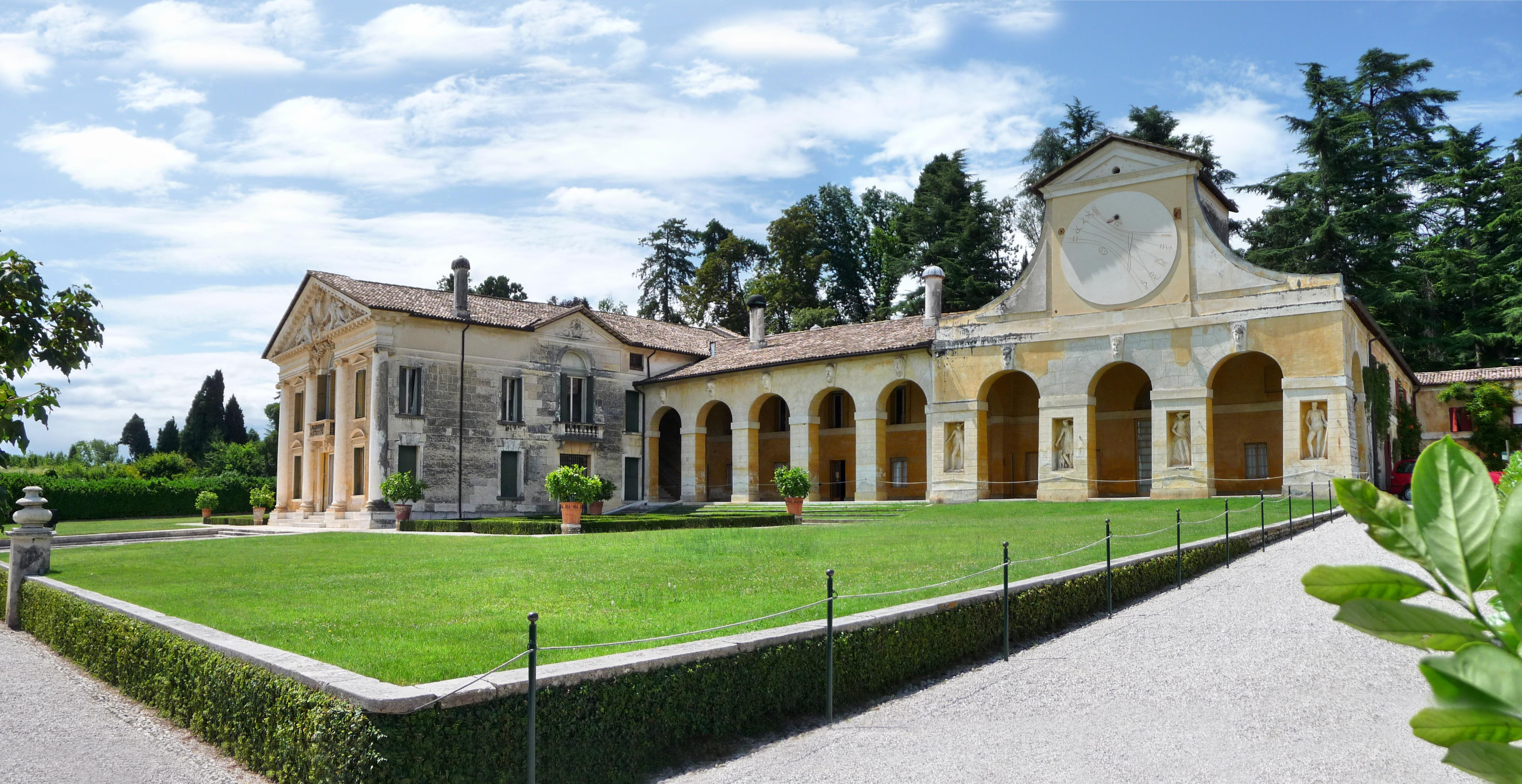
Villa Barbaro

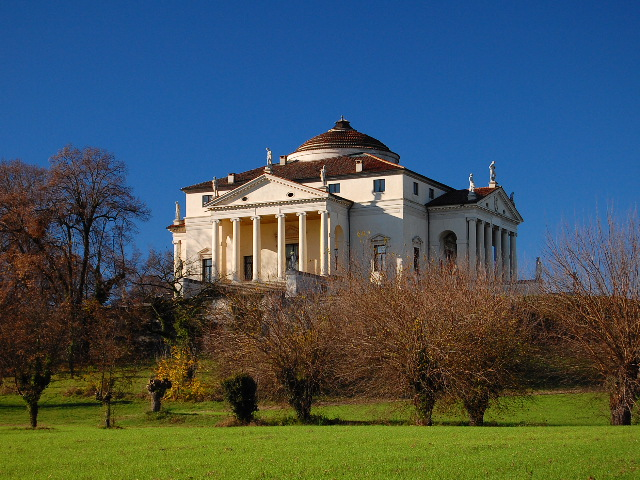
The Villa Capra "La Rotonda"

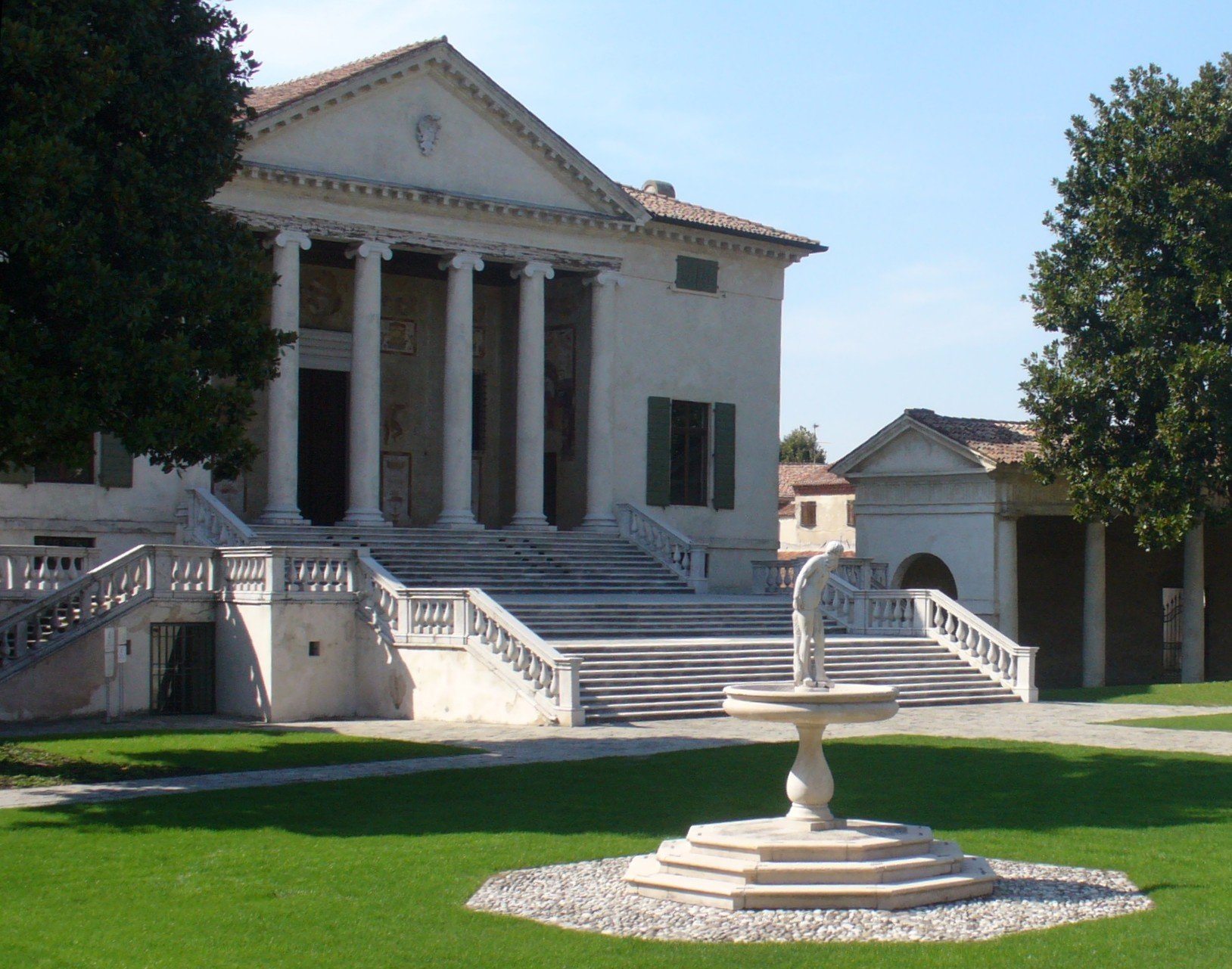
Villa Badoer

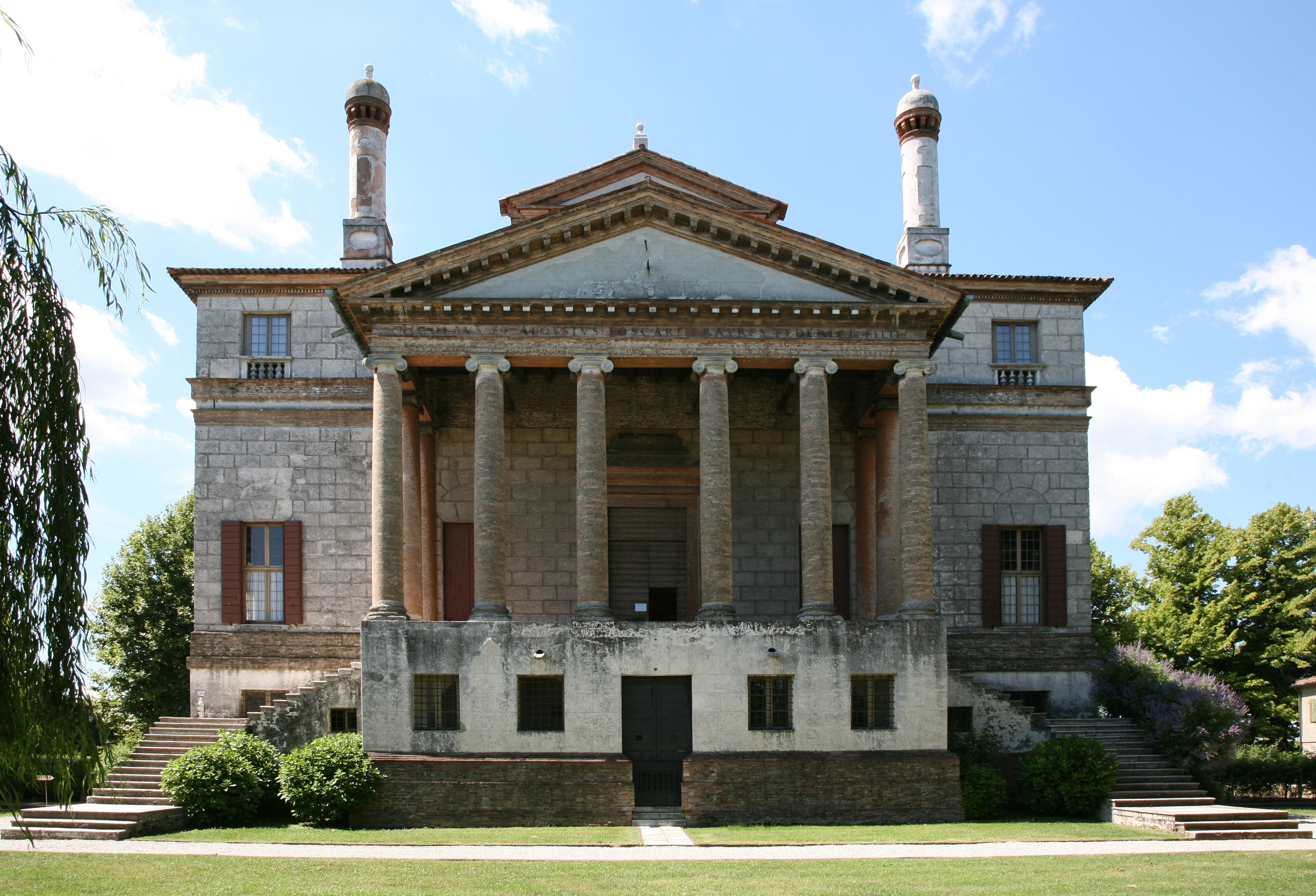
Villa Malcontenta

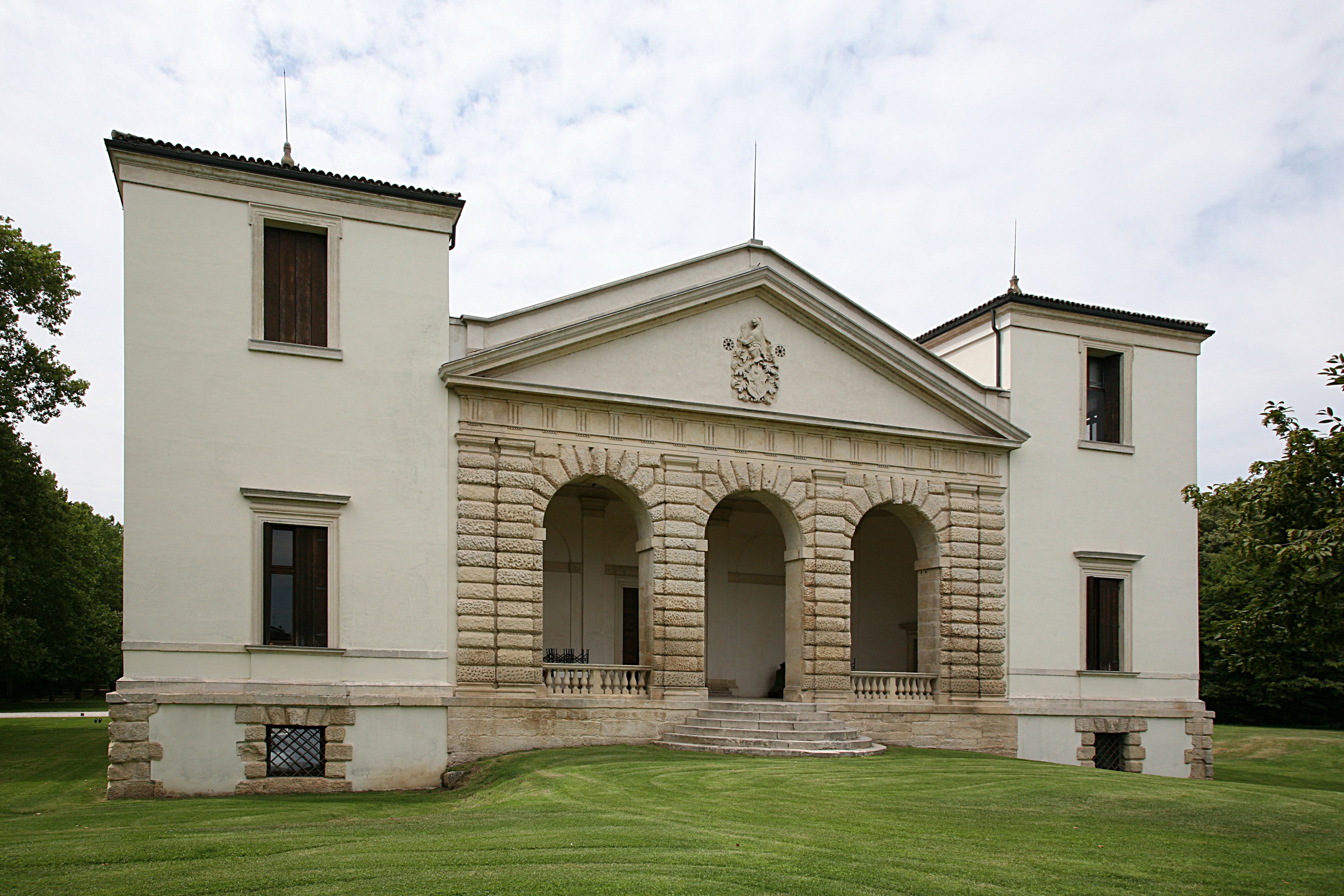
Villa Pisani (Bagnolo)

Vicenza and the Palladian Villas of Veneto are a number of Palladian villas which are World Heritage Sites. UNESCO inscribed the site on the World Heritage List in 1994. At first the site was called "Vicenza, City of Palladio" and only buildings in the immediate area of Vicenza were included. Various types of buildings were represented including the Teatro Olimpico, palazzi and a few villas. Most of Palladio's surviving villas lay outside the site. However, in 1996 the number of Palladian villas included in the site was expanded to include those in other parts of Veneto. The site was given its present name.

The term villa was used to describe a country house. Often rich families in Veneto also had a house in town called a palazzo. In most cases the owners named their palazzi and villas with the family surname, hence there is both a Palazzo Chiericati in Vicenza and a Villa Chiericati in the countryside, similarly there is a Palazzo Foscari in Venice and a Villa Foscari in the countryside. Somewhat confusingly there are multiple Villas Pisani, including two by Palladio.

There are these sorts of villas all over the Venetian plain, but especially in the provinces of Treviso, Padua, Vicenza and Venice. The date of construction of these villas ranges from the 15th to the 19th century. There are approximately five thousand Ville Venete, of which 1,400 are declared of historical and monumental interest.

Apart from the numerous Palladian villas, of which 24 are protected by UNESCO, there are many villas spread across Veneto, mainly from the 16th, 17th and 18th centuries. Many of them are museums, public institutions or private residences. The 24 Palladian villas which are part of UNESCO:

- Villa Almerico Capra, also called "La Rotonda" (Vicenza)
- Villa Gazzotti Grimani (Vicenza, but in the village of Bertesina)
- Villa Angarano, also known as Villa Bianchi Michiel (Bassano del Grappa VI)
- Villa Caldogno (Caldogno VI)
- Villa Chiericati (Vancimuglio di Grumolo delle Abbadesse VI)
- Villa Forni Cerato (Montecchio Precalcino VI)
- Villa Godi (Lonedo di Lugo di Vicenza)
- Villa Pisani (Bagnolo di Lonigo VI)
- Villa Pojana (Poiana Maggiore VI)
- Villa Saraceno (Agugliaro VI)
- Villa Thiene (Quinto Vicentino VI)
- Villa Trissino (Meledo di Sarego VI)
- Villa Trissino (Vicenza, in Cricoli)
- Villa Valmarana (Lisiera di Bolzano Vicentino VI)
- Villa Valmarana (Vigardolo di Monticello Conte Otto VI)
- Villa Piovene (Lugo di Vicenza VI)
- Villa Badoer, called "La Badoera" (Fratta Polesine RO)
- Villa Barbaro (Maser TV)
- Villa Emo (Vedelago TV)
- Villa Zeno (Cessalto TV)
- Villa Foscari, called La Malcontenta (Mira VE)
- Villa Pisani (Montagnana PD)
- Villa Cornaro (Piombino Dese PD)
- Villa Serego (Santa Sofia di Pedemonte VI)

Amongst these, Villa Trissino (Cricoli) is not regarded a Palladian villa, but is also an important country house.

=== Parks ===
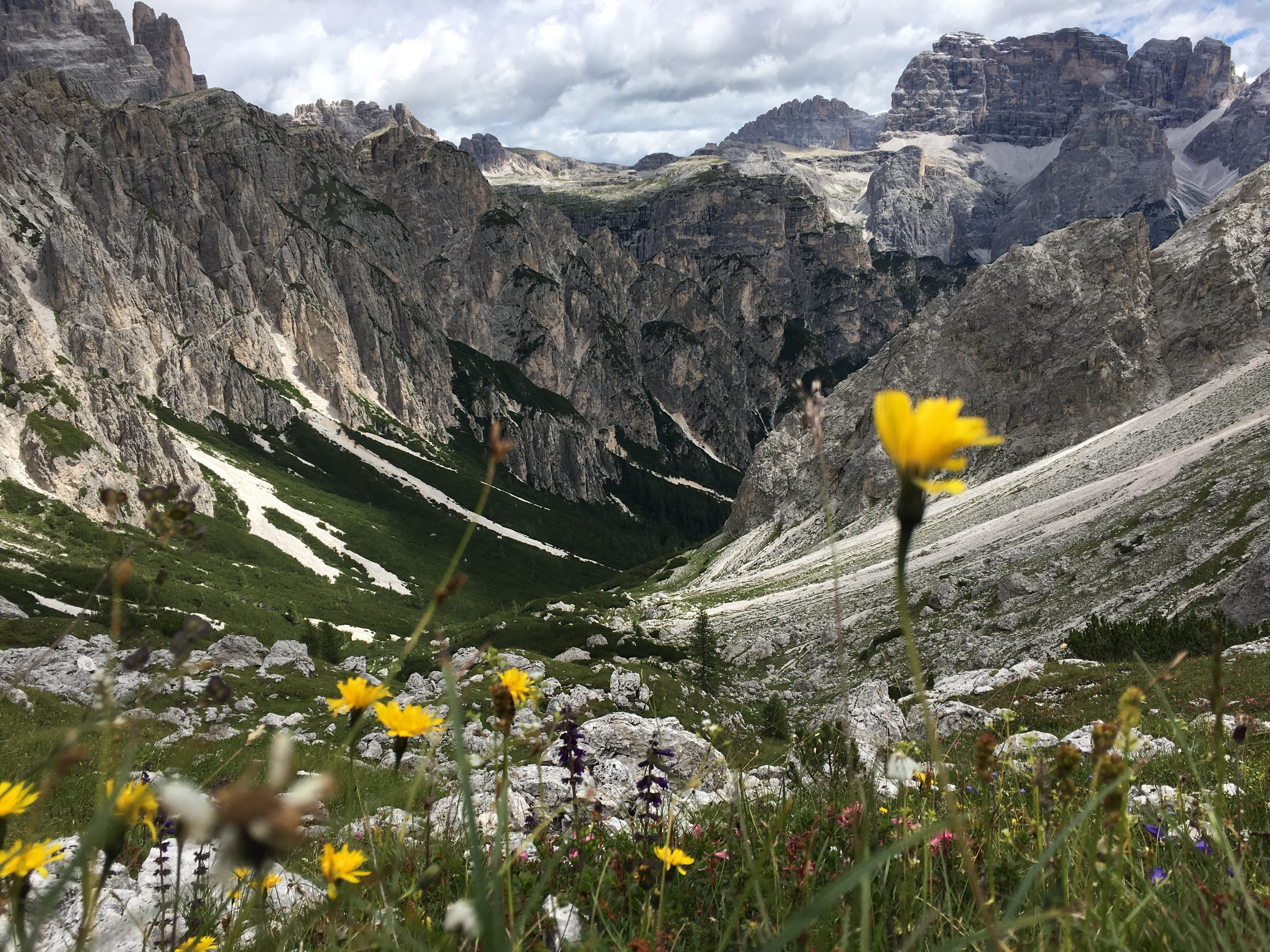
Dolomiti Bellunesi National Park

- Dolomiti Bellunesi National Park is situated in the southern section of the Province of Belluno.
- Cansiglio is a pre-alpine massif located in the north-eastern Veneto in the provinces of Treviso and Belluno.

=== Lakes ===
The area of Lake Garda is a major tourist destination. Various towns along the lake, such as Lazise, Cisano, Bardolino, Garda (VR), Torri del Benaco and Malcesine, are resorts.

=== Mountains ===
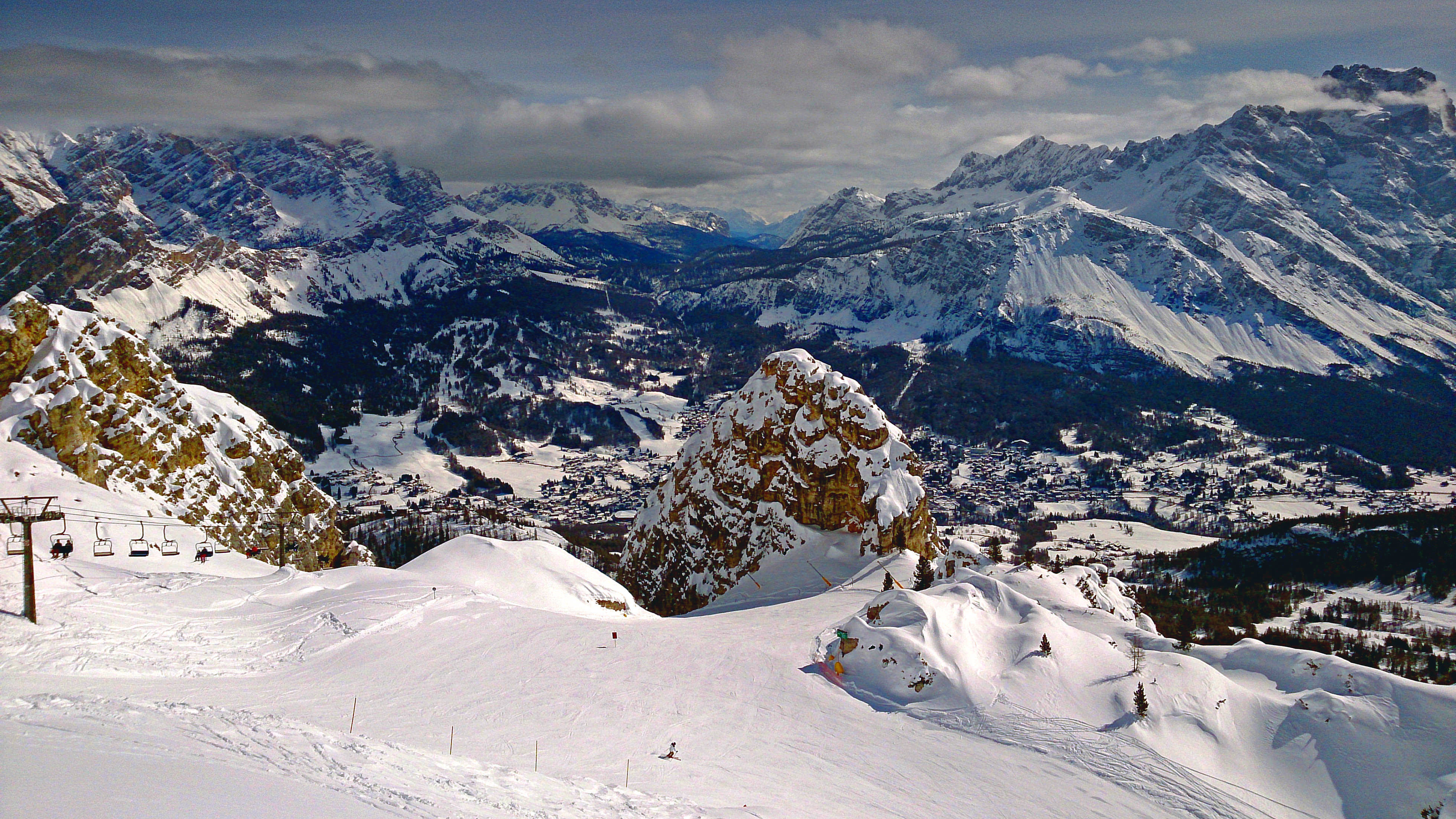
A ski resort in Cortina d'Ampezzo

Cortina d'Ampezzo is situated in the province of Belluno and is one of the most exclusive mountain locations in Europe together with Kitzbühel in Austria and St. Moritz in Switzerland. It was scene of the 1956 Winter Olympics and hosted once again in 2026 alongside Milan. To the north there are the Tre Cime di Lavaredo, said to be a symbol of the Italian Dolomites.

- Auronzo is in the upper Cadore.
- Arabba lies between the Sella group and the Marmolada.
- Monte Lozzo
- Monte Ricco

Other landmark places are:

- Mount Pasubio and Strada delle 52 Gallerie (a military mule road built during World War I with 52 tunnels)
- Altopiano di Asiago and Calà del Sasso, with 4444 steps, the world's longest staircase open to the public.
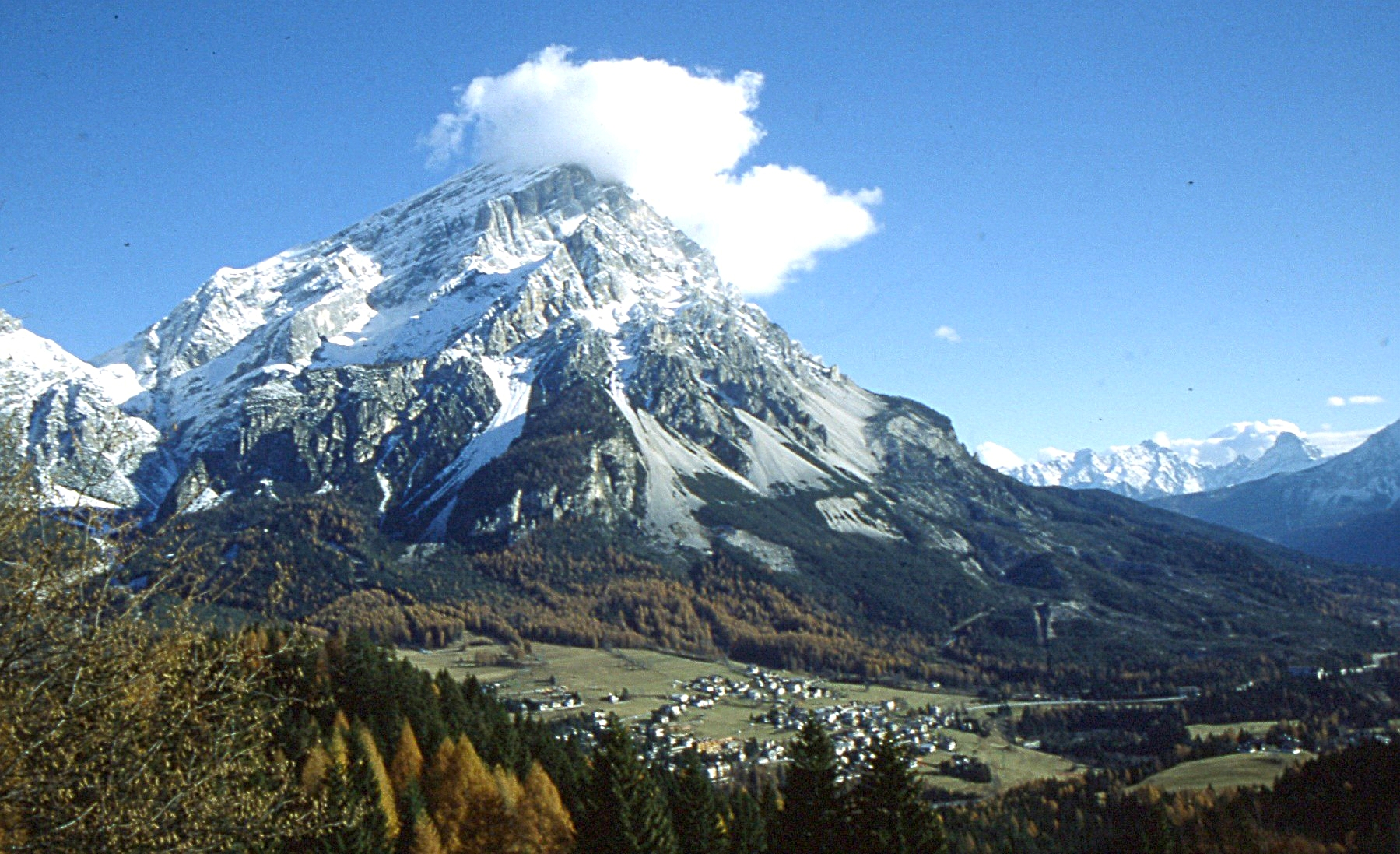
The mount Antelao

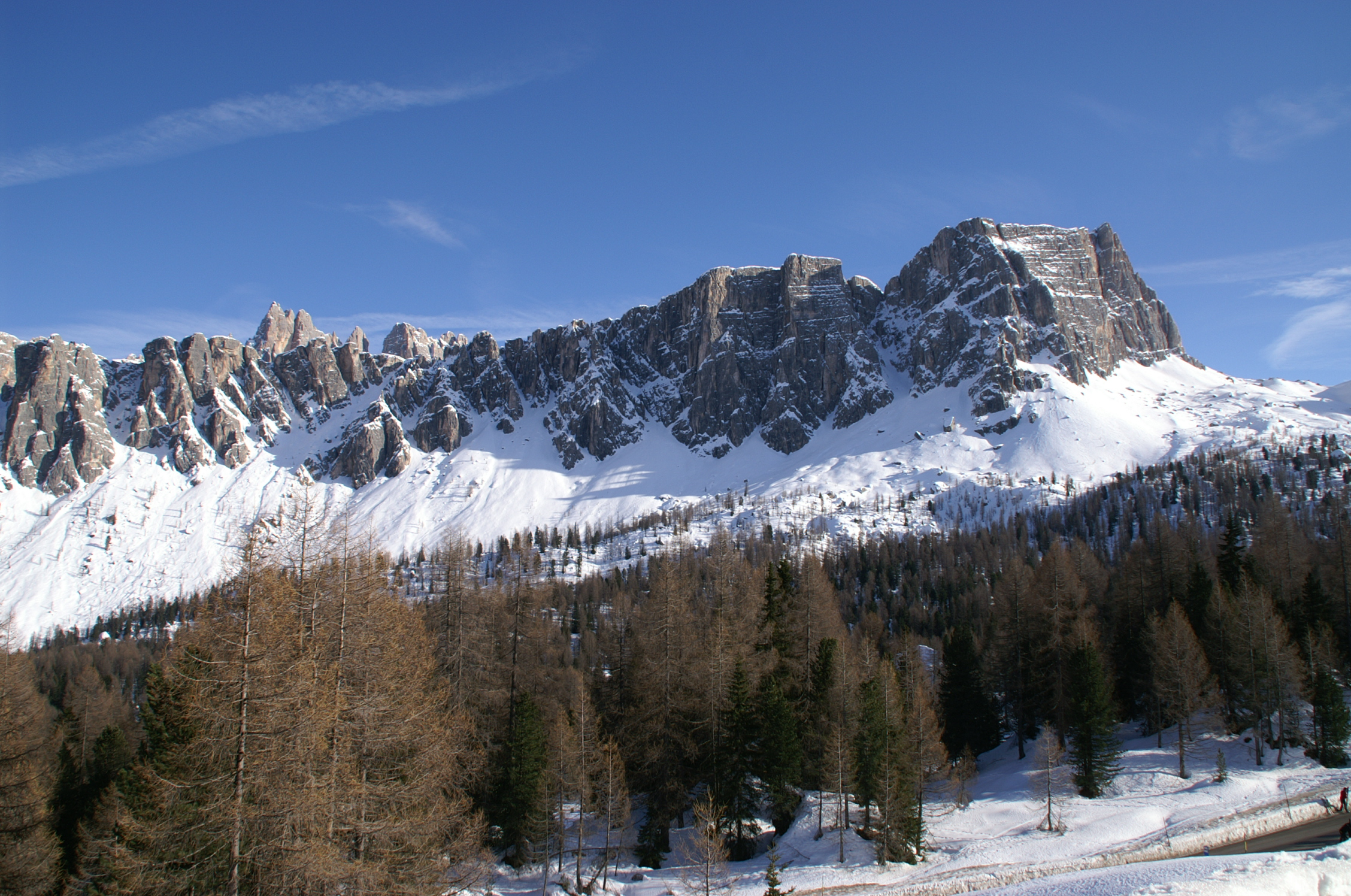
Lastoi de Formin (Cadore)

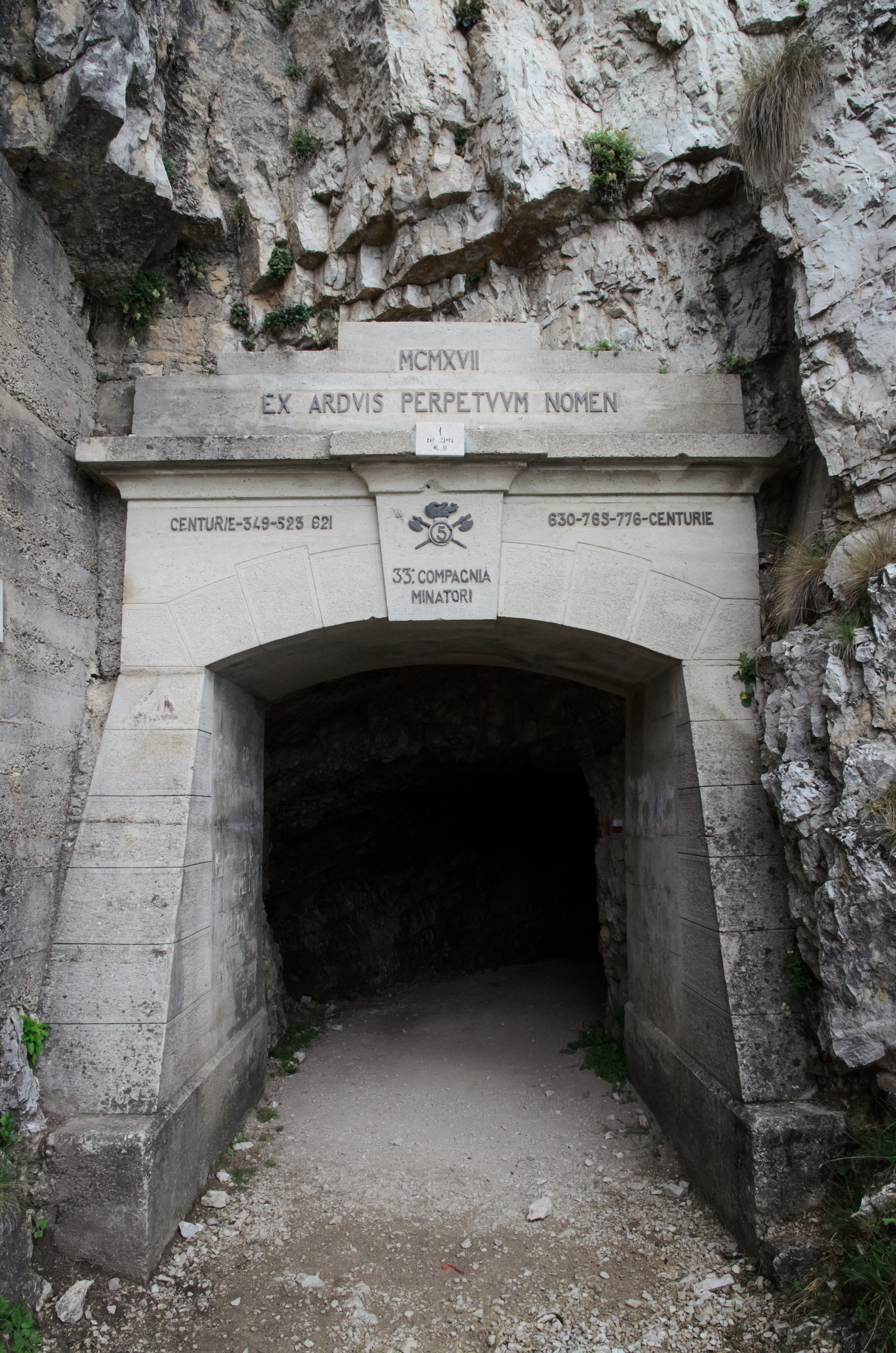
The start of Strada delle 52 Gallerie

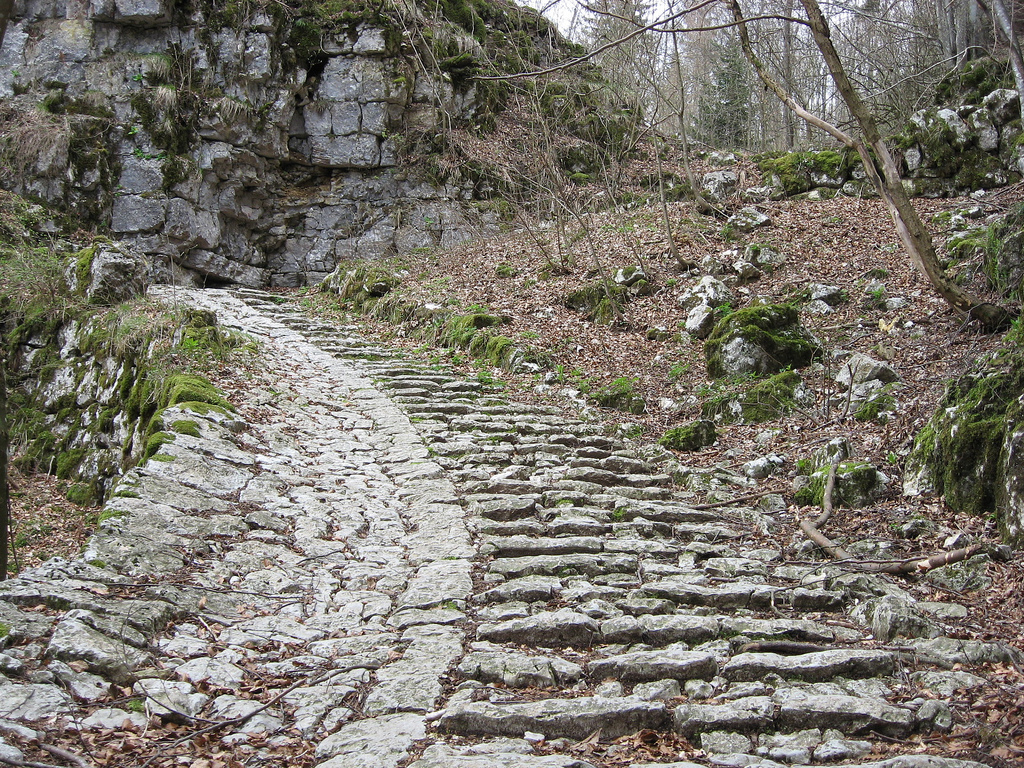
A trait that shows the structure of the Calà del Sasso

=== Thermal baths ===
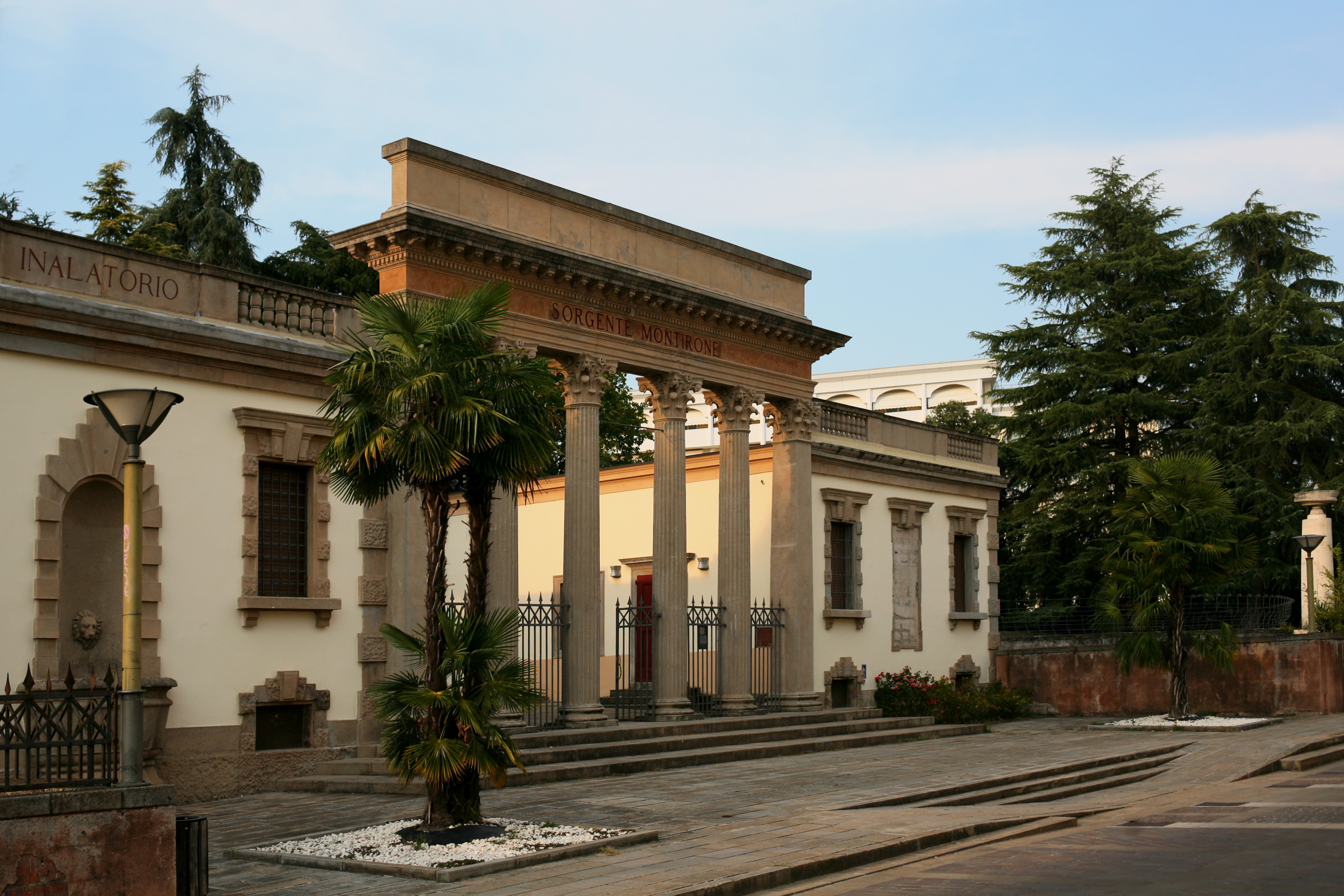
Thermal baths in Abano Terme

The thermal baths of Abano Terme are an important tourist attraction. Montegrotto Terme and Recoaro Terme are other resorts.

=== Beaches ===
Venice's Lido is an 11-kilometre-long sandbar, visited by many tourists every summer.

Jesolo is one of the most important seaside resorts on the Adriatic coast, just a few kilometres far from Venice. Every year Jesolo gives accommodation to over 4.5 million tourists.

Caorle has often received awards for one of the cleanest beaches in Italy. Bibione, Eraclea and Sottomarina are resorts too. Albarella island is a private island on the Lido. Alberoni Beach is set in a nature reserve.

== Transport ==
=== Air ===
The region is served by two major international airports, Venice Marco Polo Airport and Verona Villafranca Airport. Treviso Airport is a smaller international airport mainly serving low-cost carriers.

== Sister regions ==
- Iowa (USA)
