= Gianfranco Stevanin =

Italian criminal and serial killer

- Born: 2 October 1960 (age 66); Montagnana, Italy
- Other names: "The Monster of Terrazzo" "The Landru of the Bassa"
- Conviction: Murder
- Penalty: Life imprisonment

Details
- Victims: 6
- Span of crimes: 1993–1994
- Country: Italy
- State: Veneto
- Date apprehended: 16 November 1994
- Imprisoned at: Sulmona Prison

Gianfranco Stevanin (born 2 October 1960), known as The Monster of Terrazzo, is an Italian criminal and serial killer, convicted of murdering six women between 1993 and 1994. His case had great prominence in the national media and raised a debate on the question of the incapability of criminals to understand the consequences of their acts.

== Capture ==
On 16 November 1994, in Vicenza, Stevanin picked up a prostitute named Gabriele Musger in his Volvo 240, offering her money to have sex and take pictures of her. After several hours of extreme sexual games, Musger tried to escape through the window of a bathroom and later refused to take other pictures, resulting in being threatened with a knife by Stevanin. To save her life, she offered Stevanin all her savings (about 25 million lire) if he let her go, and he accepted; however, the money was at Musger's house, and then the two got into his car to go to get it. At a toll booth in Vicenza, Stevanin stopped to pay the toll, and at that moment the prostitute managed to get out of the car, go to a police car and report her client for sexual violence. The police arrested him for sexual assault, extortion, and possession of a toy gun without the required red cap. Following this event, he was sentenced to 2 years and 6 months imprisonment.

== Investigations ==
During searches of his house, investigators found prohibited pornographic material (including over 7000 photographs personally taken by Stevanin and his partners), anatomy books, boxes containing pubic hair and a file containing information on all his partners. Although the police consider Stevanin the only one in the group who violated and attempted extortion, investigators began to suspect more serious crimes after finding objects belonging to a woman named Biljana Pavlovic, who has been missing since August 1994, and Claudia Pulejo. The two girls were also mentioned in Stevanin's files. The man justified himself by saying that he had short relationships with them and that the clothes were just love tokens that the girls had left him.

On 3 July 1995, a farmer from Terrazzo found a sack containing the remains of a corpse on a plot near Stevanin's house. Stevanin became a murder suspect, and the magistrate sent bulldozers to look for other bodies.

On 12 November 1995, the body of another woman was found; this time the body was also found in a sack, but on this occasion the discovery took place on land owned by Stevanin, with the DNA test unequivocally showing that the body was that of Biljana Pavlovic. On 1 December 1995, a third body was found, that of Claudia Pulejo.

Stevanin was questioned by the investigators but his attitude was controversial: at times he seemed to remember something, and then denied it immediately, claiming that he had an empty memory. Other murders attributed to him include the murder of Austrian prostitute Roswita Adlassnig, who had been missing for a few months and present both in Stevanin's photos and his files, and another murder of an unidentified woman with whom he evidently engaged in a sexual act after she was dead.

On 24 September 1996 (after the partial confession of Stevanin), another unidentified body was found in the Adige. After a DNA test, the body was recognized as that of Blazenca Smolijo.

== Confessions ==
On 19 July 1996, Stevanin decided to confess and claimed to have dismembered the bodies of four women, but that their murders weren't premeditated, as they had died during extreme sexual relations, or, in the case of Pulejo, due to a heroin overdose. Regarding the unidentified corpse, he stated that she was a student whose name and face he did not remember, saying he had met her only three or four times. Stevanin later claimed that he acted without knowing what he was doing, as if his actions were just dreams.

== Trial ==
After several sessions of psychiatric examinations, Stevanin was declared competent and able to understand the consequences of his actions, with the experts saying that he was mentally capable, of normal or slightly above normal intelligence (IQ of 114) and a skilled computist. The defence experts tried to challenge the psychiatric report, stating that all the disturbances of Gianfranco Stevanin are due to a previous motorcycle accident that almost cost him his life.

Stevanin showed up at the sessions with a shaved head, to show off the evident scar that, according to the defence, is at the base of everything. The first sentence by the Court of Assizes of Verona, on 29 January 1998, condemned Gianfranco Stevanin to life imprisonment, out of which 3 years would be spent in total daytime isolation.

In January 1999, Stevanin sold his house and all the land he owned to partially compensate the families of the victims. On 7 July, the Appellate Court of Venice absolved the accused of murder charges because he was incapable of understanding his actions and re-sentenced him to 10.5 years for concealment and mutilation of a corpse.

The first section of the Court of Cassation of Rome then cancelled the sentence by "illogical motivation", referring to a new section of appeal reviewing the case. In December 2000, while he was locked up in a mental asylum, Stevanin was seriously injured in the neck with a razor blade inflicted by another non-European prisoner.

The final sentence was announced on 23 March 2001: the Appellate Court of Venice declared that Gianfranco Stevanin was capable of understanding his crimes, which is why his sentence was automatically confirmed to life imprisonment. The Court of Cassation confirmed the sentence, rejecting the defence's demands.

On 1 September 2010, he told the press that he did not remember anything about his murders and also affirmed his desire to become a Franciscan lay brother because of his mother's death, thus emulating another case that occurred seventy years ago, when Alessandro Serenelli, murderer of Maria Goretti, also became a Franciscan while in prison.

In October 2020, Stevanin's lawyer announced the filing of petitions for a new psychiatric evaluation and for an alternative sentence.

As of October 2020, he is still imprisoned in the Sulmona prison in Abruzzo, where he saved the life of a cellmate who tried to commit suicide twice.

== Timeline of crimes and imprisonment ==
- concealment of a corpse
- sexual violence against Maria Luisa Mezzari
- sexual violence and kidnapping of Gabriele Musger
- murder of Biljana Pavlovic
- murder of Claudia Pulejo
- murder of Blazenca Smolijo
- murder of an unknown girl
- murder of an unknown girl, raped post-mortem by Stevanin
- 3 years of daytime isolation
- 150 million lire for each family of the recognized victims

Another murder attributed to Stevanin is that of Roswita Adlassing, seen for the last time in his company, but her body was never found. She would be his sixth victim. The murder was committed in May 1993.

== See also ==
- Monster of Florence
- Donato Bilancia
- Luigi Chiatti
- Ferdinand Gamper
- List of serial killers by country

== Bibliography ==
- Carlo Lucarelli and Massimo Picozzi: La Nera, Arnoldo Mondadori Editore, 2006, p. 264-269
