= Chiatti =

Chiatti is a surname. Notable people with the surname include:

- Abigaille Bruschi-Chiatti (c. 1855–after 1888), Italian soprano
- Laura Chiatti (born 1982), Italian actress and singer
- Luigi Chiatti (born 1968), Italian serial killer
