= Badia Polesine =

- Comune
- Comune di Badia Polesine
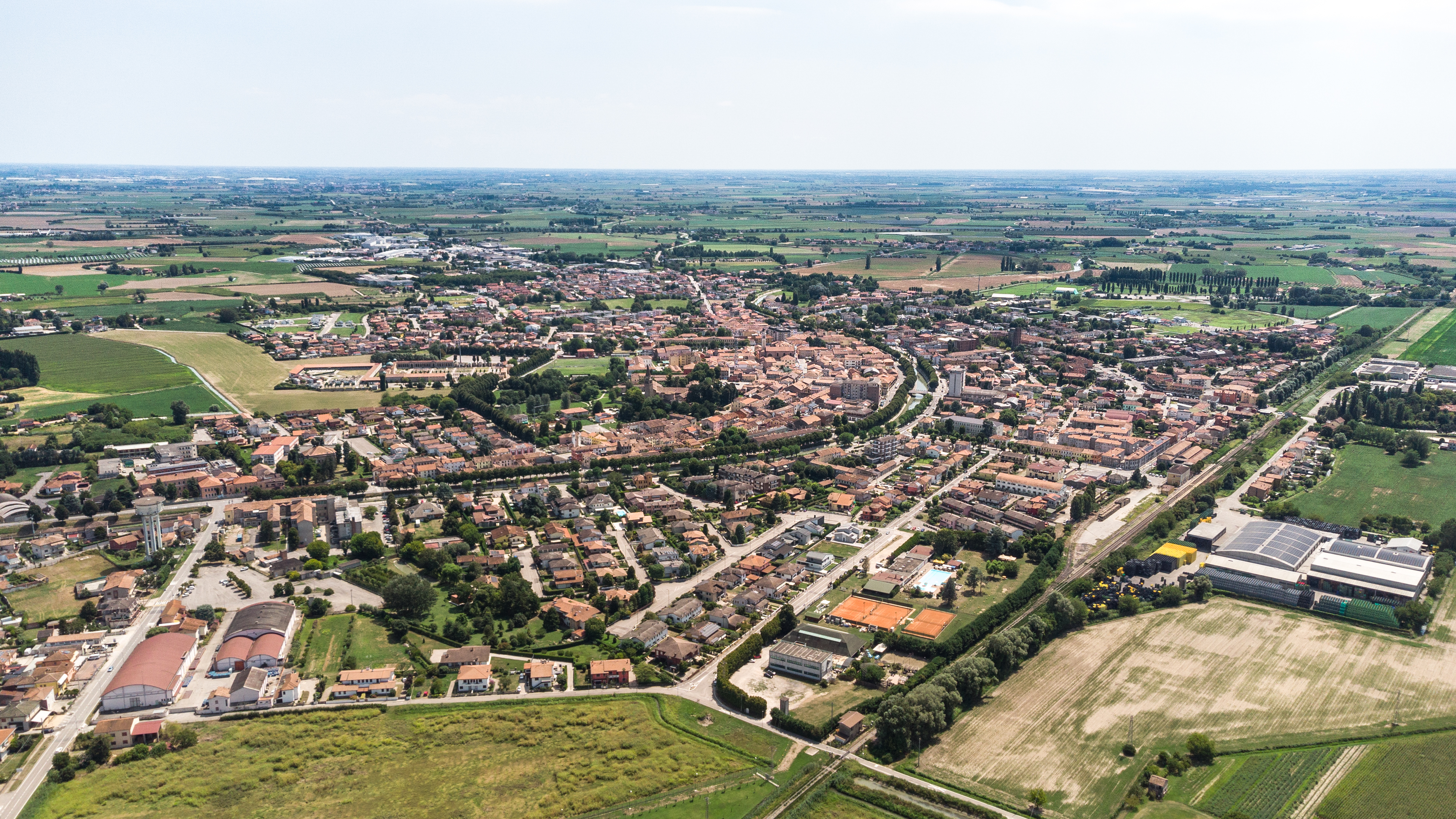
- Aerial view of Badia Polesine

- Location within Italy Location within Veneto
- Coordinates: 45°6′N 11°30′E
- Country: Italy
- Region: Veneto
- Province: Rovigo (RO)
- Frazioni: Barchetta, Bovazecchino-Serraglio, Ca' Bulgaron, Colombano, Crocetta, Fornaci, Masetti, Nezzo, Orti, Rosta, Salvaterra, Villa d'Adige, Villa Fora

Government
  - Mayor: Giovanni Rossi

Area
  - Total: 44.53 km^{2} (17.19 sq mi)
- Elevation: 11 m (36 ft)

Population (30 April 2022)
  - Total: 10,001
  - Density: 224.6/km^{2} (581.7/sq mi)
- Demonym: Badiesi
- Time zone: UTC+1 (CET)
  - Summer (DST): UTC+2 (CEST)
- Postal code: 45021
- Dialing code: 0425
- Website: Official website

Badia Polesine is a comune (municipality) in the Province of Rovigo in the Italian region Veneto, located about 70 kilometres (43 miles) southwest of Venice and about 25 kilometres (16 miles) west of Rovigo. It is part of the upper Polesine, and is bounded by the Adige river, which separates the communal territory from the province of Padua.

Badia Polesine borders the following municipalities: Canda, Castagnaro, Castelbaldo, Giacciano con Baruchella, Lendinara, Masi, Piacenza d'Adige, Terrazzo, Trecenta.

The main sight is the abbey of Vangadizza, the former monastery that gives the town its name (Badia means abbey).

The town has a station on the Verona-Legnago-Rovigo railroad. It can be reached by road through the SS343 Transpolesana national road and the A31 motorway.

== Twin towns ==
Badia Polesine is twinned with:

- Estepa, Spain
- Saint-Thibault-des-Vignes, France

== Sport ==
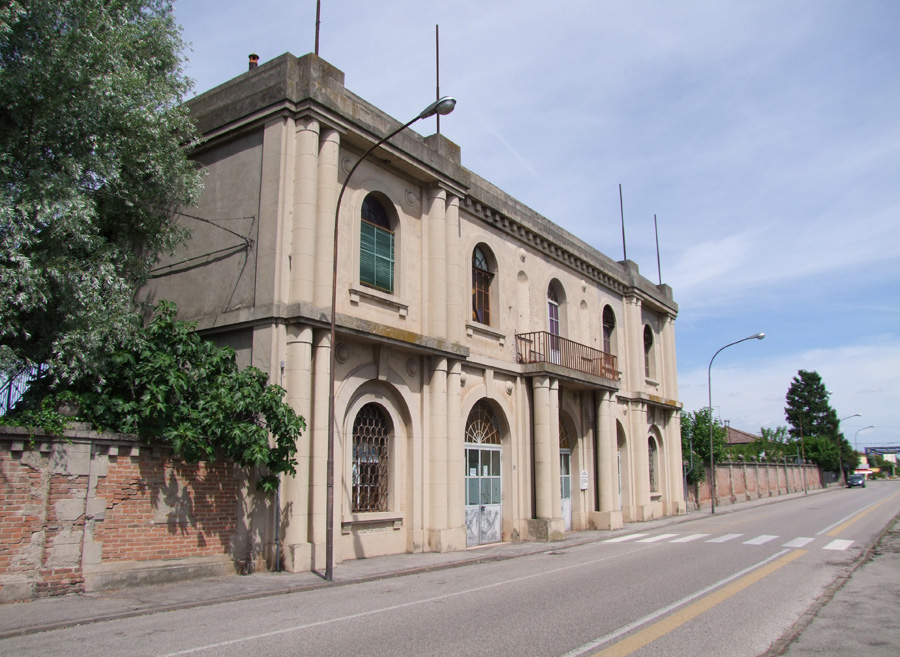
The entrance to the Stadio Ottorino Verzaro in 2019

- Valentino Degani-Tino Magnan" Stadium (Football)
- Nuovi Impianti Sportivi Comunali hosted the Italy versus France match during the 2015 Women's Six Nations Championship.
- The Stadio Ottorino Verzaro built in 1928, which is located on the Via Roma, was used as a motorcycle speedway venue, and hosted important events, including qualifying rounds of the Italian Championships, as part of the Speedway World Championship, starting in 1987 and a qualifying round of the Speedway World Team Cup in 1981.
