= Masi, Veneto =

Masi
- Comune
- Comune di Masi
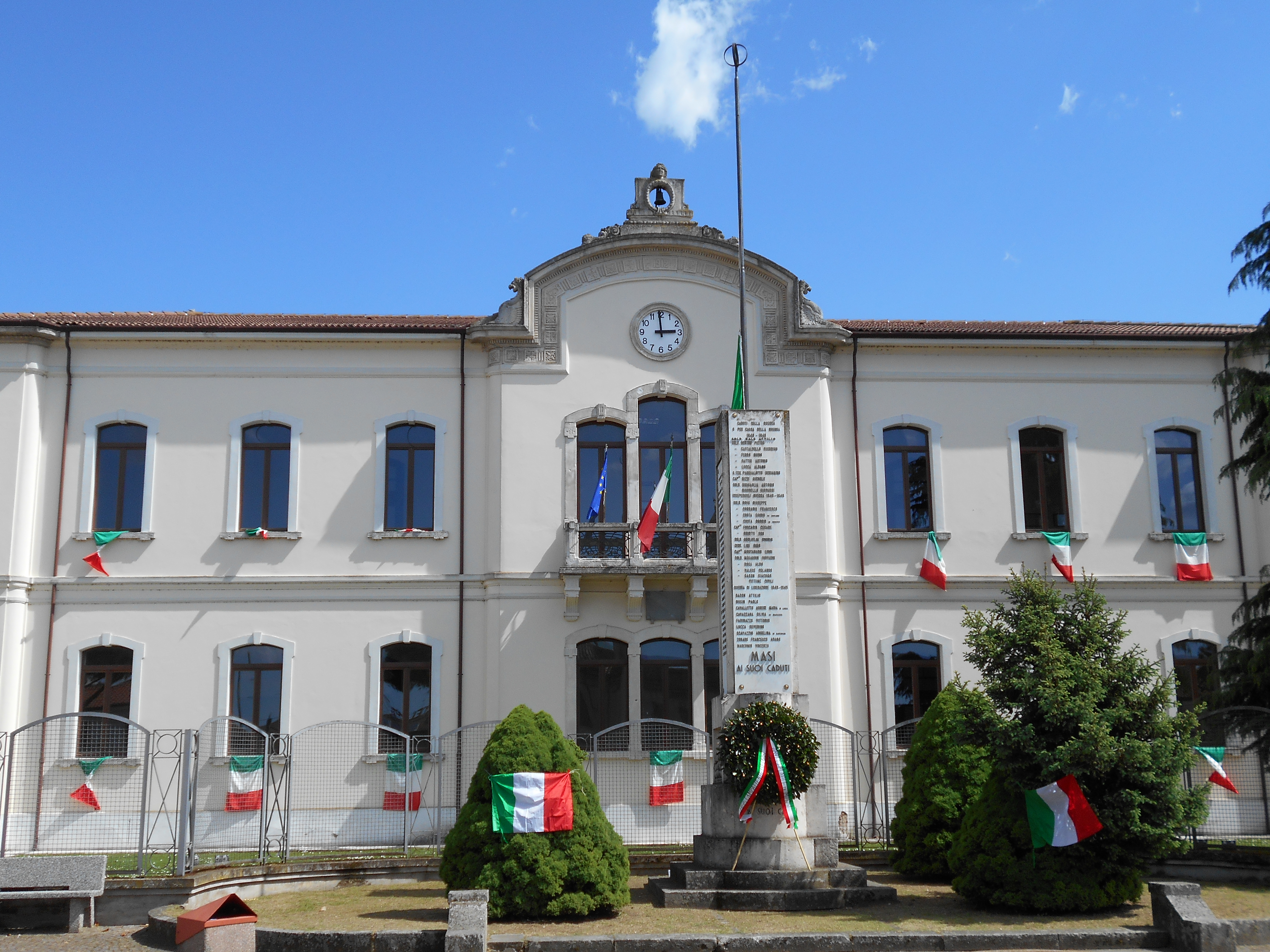
- Town hall.

- Location within Italy Location within Veneto
- Coordinates: 45°7′N 11°30′E
- Country: Italy
- Region: Veneto
- Province: Padua (PD)

Government
  - Mayor: Cosimo Galassini

Area
  - Total: 13.77 km^{2} (5.32 sq mi)
- Elevation: 11 m (36 ft)

Population (31 August 2021)
  - Total: 1,746
  - Density: 126.8/km^{2} (328.4/sq mi)
- Time zone: UTC+1 (CET)
  - Summer (DST): UTC+2 (CEST)
- Postal code: 35040
- Dialing code: 0425
- Website: Official website

Masi is a comune (municipality) in the Province of Padua in the Italian region Veneto, located about 70 kilometres (43 mi) southwest of Venice and about 45 kilometres (28 mi) southwest of Padua.

Masi borders the following municipalities: Badia Polesine, Castelbaldo, Merlara, Piacenza d'Adige.

== People ==
- Fausto Zonaro (1854 - 1929), the last Court Painter to the Ottoman Empire.
