= Giacciano con Baruchella =

- Comune
- Comune di Giacciano con Baruchella
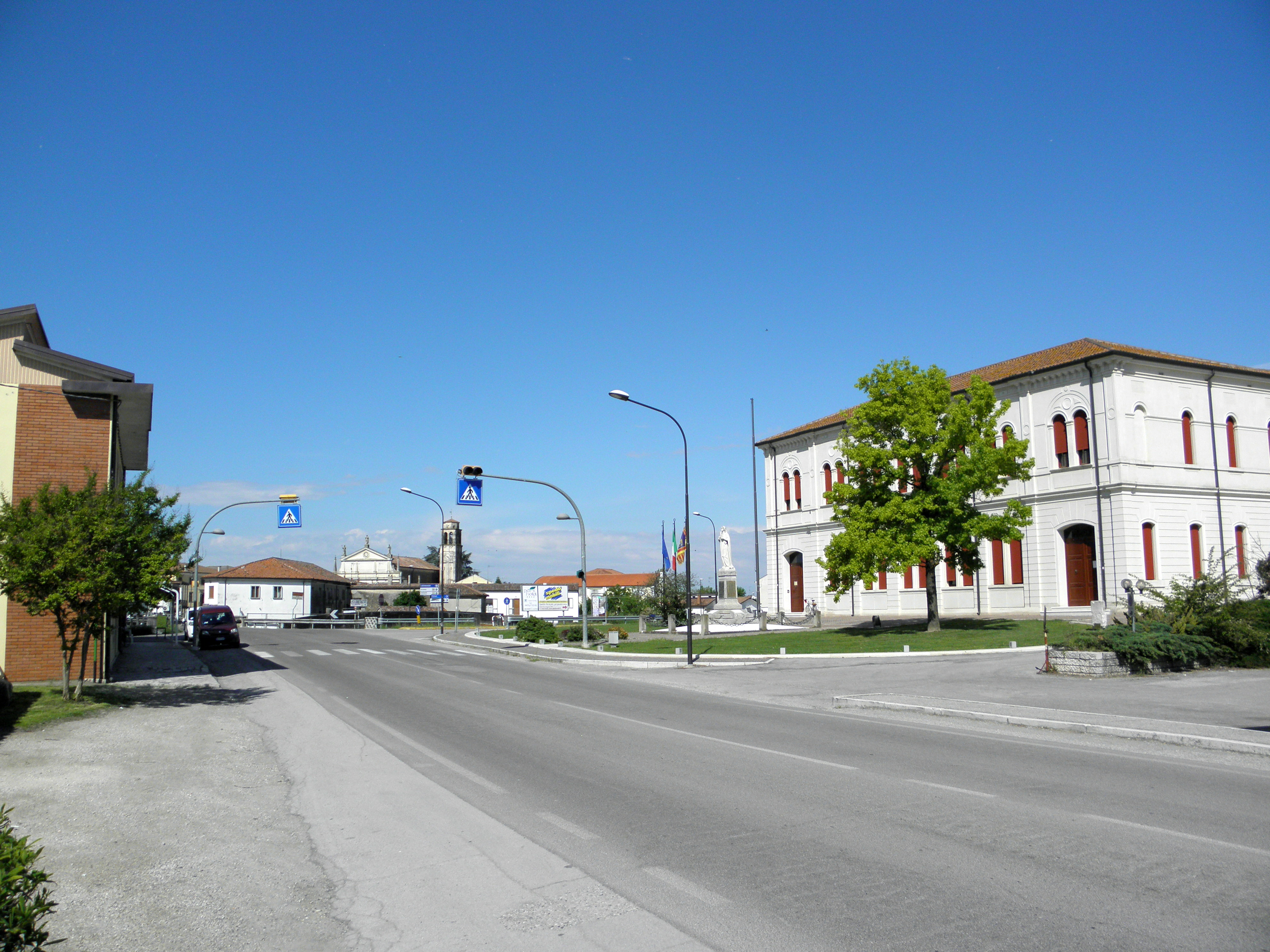
- Via Oriano Scavazza and Town Hall in Baruchella.

- Coat of arms

- Location within Italy Location within Veneto
- Coordinates: 45°4′N 11°27′E
- Country: Italy
- Region: Veneto
- Province: Rovigo (RO)
- Frazioni: Baruchella (municipal seat), Giacciano, Zelo

Government
  - Mayor: Natale Pigaiani

Area
  - Total: 18.3 km^{2} (7.1 sq mi)
- Elevation: 14 m (46 ft)

Population (30 April 2022)
  - Total: 2,040
  - Density: 111/km^{2} (289/sq mi)
- Demonym: Baruchellesi
- Time zone: UTC+1 (CET)
  - Summer (DST): UTC+2 (CEST)
- Postal code: 45020
- Dialing code: 0425
- Website: Official website

Giacciano con Baruchella is a comune (municipality) in the Province of Rovigo in the Italian region Veneto, located about 80 kilometres (50 mi) southwest of Venice and about 25 kilometres (16 mi) west of Rovigo.

Giacciano con Baruchella borders the following municipalities: Badia Polesine, Castagnaro, Castelnovo Bariano, Ceneselli, Trecenta, Villa Bartolomea.

== Twin towns ==
Giacciano con Baruchella is twinned with:

- Ludza Municipality, Latvia
