= Walls of Legnago =

Defensive fortifications in Legnago, Italy

Walls of the Fortress of Legnago
- Mura della Rocca di Legnago
- Legnago, Veneto in Italy
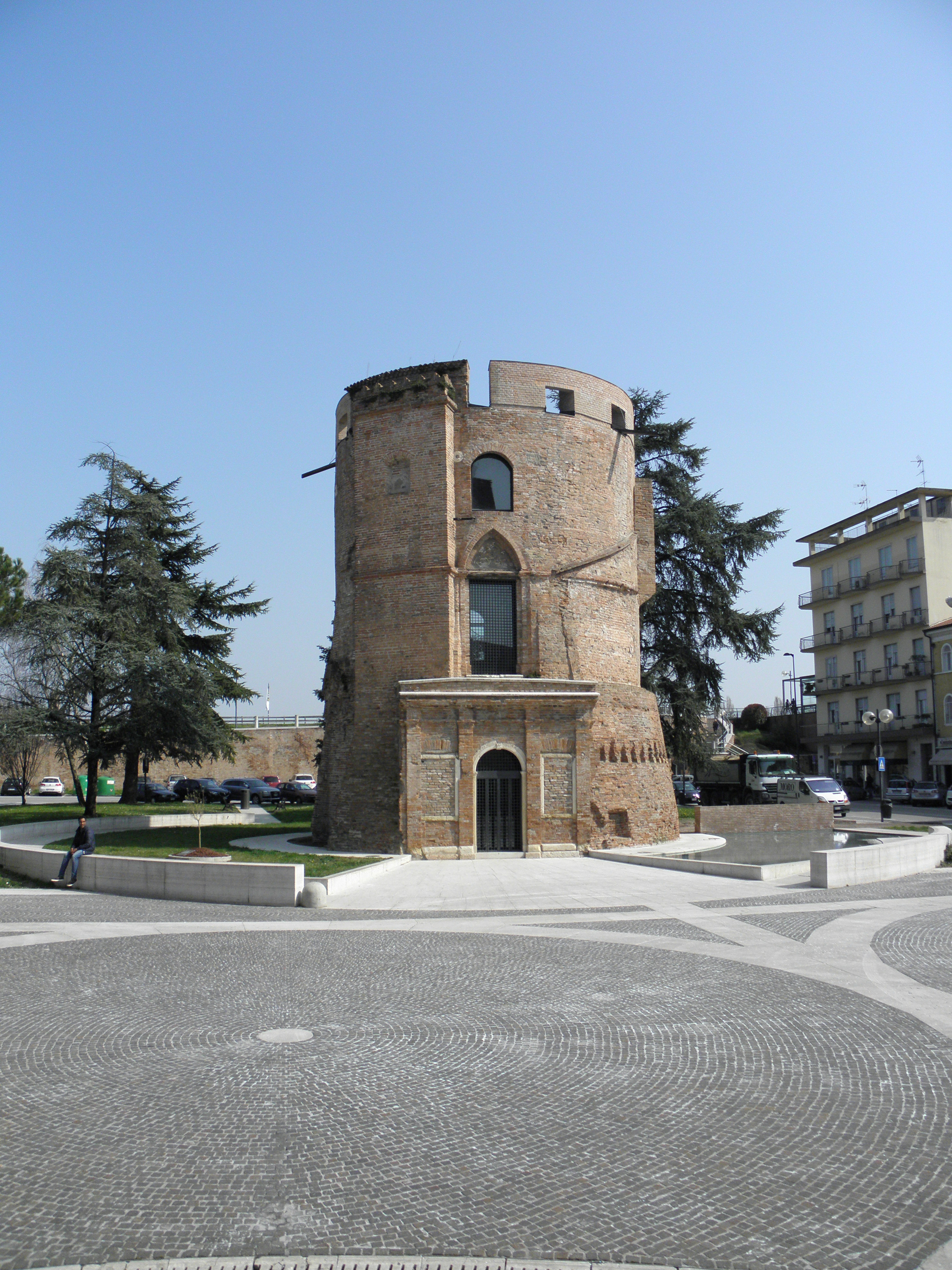
- The Keep of Legnago, the only remaining part of the ancient fortress.

Site information
- Type: Defensive wall

Location
- Coordinates: 45.1936°N 11.3032°E

Site history
- Built: 10th century
- Demolished: 16th century

Sixteenth-century walls of Legnago
- Mura cinquecentesche di Legnago
- Legnago, Veneto in Italy
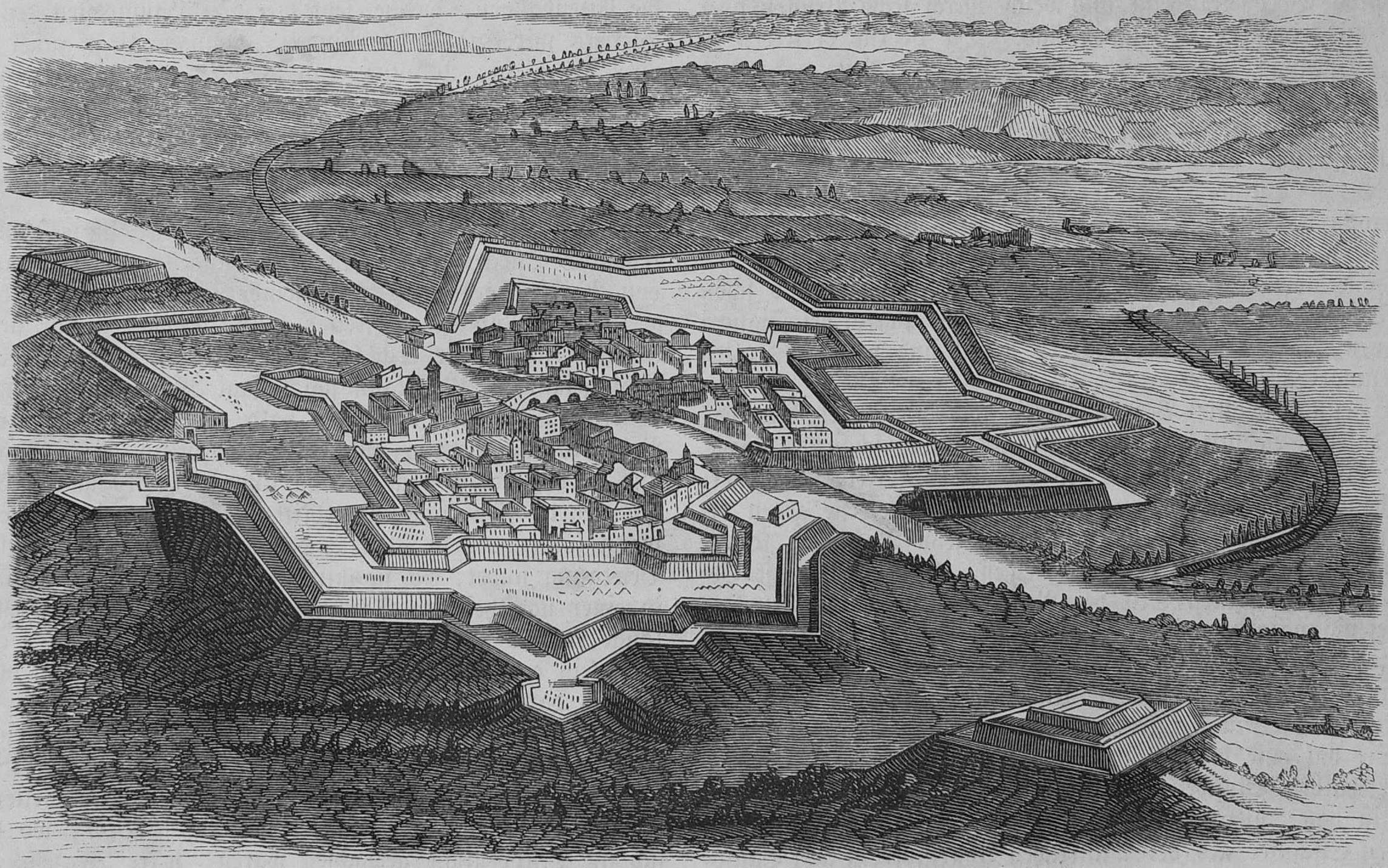
- The fortress of Legnago in a print from 1867.

Site information
- Type: Defensive wall
- Owner: Republic of Venice Kingdom of Lombardy–Venetia Kingdom of Italy

Site history
- Built: 1528-1540
- Architect: Michele Sanmicheli
- Demolished: 1887

The walls of Legnago were defensive walls built in the 10th century. The fortification protected the fortress and later the town of Legnago, in the province of Verona. The structure extended on both banks of the Adige river, on which the town stands. Damaged during the 15th century, it was rebuilt during the period of Venetian domination by the Veronese architect Michele Sanmicheli. Thanks to its strategic position and the imposing 16th century walls, during the 19th century the city became an Austrian fortress of the Quadrilatero. The bastions were finally demolished in 1887 following two floods of the Adige that devastated numerous homes.

== Structure ==
The original city walls date back to the 10th century. The two layers of walls initially surrounded the area of the ancient fortress and were delimited by four circular towers of which today only the main bastion remains: the Torrione (big tower), currently the symbol of the town. The structure covered a quadrangular area. Two towers stood on the river bank, near the bridge, while the others (including the Torrione) were built to the southwest. The village extended both to the northwest of the fortress - protected by a moat - and on the opposite bank of the Adige, where the fortress of Porto stood.

From the 13th to the 15th century, the town of Legnago came under the rule of various Italian lords, including the Scaligeri, the Carraresi, the Ezzelini and the Visconti. Under the influence of the Visconti family in particular, the fortress underwent major stabilization and restructuring works, but it was only with Michele Sanmicheli's project in 1528 that Legnago began to transform into a fortified town.

The new city walls extended in a star shape around the original center of the town and around the Porto district, on the left bank of the river. They included six bastions (three for Legnago, three for Porto) and five gates. Three of these were located on the right bank of the Adige: from north to south, they were Porta San Martino (or Veronexa, the main entrance to the city), Porta Mantova (or Porta Nuova) and Porta Ferrara. Porto was protected by Porta Padova, to the north, and Porta Stupa, to the south. The bastions were called Bastione San Martino, San Giovanni, San Bernardo (on the Legnago side, from north to south respectively), Bastione di Sopra, Bastione San Pietro and Bastione di Sotto (on the Porto side, from north to south respectively). The walls were built using different materials: bricks, river pebbles, clay shards and white limestone.

The area corresponding to the fortress was used as a square. Only the keep, the main bastion of the original fortress, remained standing in the center of it. The space thus created became the main square (renamed Piazza Vittorio Emanuele II after the unification of Italy and Piazza della Libertà in 1945) of the town, on which the Cathedral of San Martino (built in 1811) and the town hall were built. Until 1945, the Torrione was surrounded by classical buildings, including the Stock Exchange building. These buildings were destroyed during the bombings of the Second World War and the space created by the demolition is now a park.

== History ==
=== The Fortress of Legnago ===
The two castles of Legnago and Porto were built on opposite banks of the Adige river around the 10th century. The fortress and the village built next to it, initially independent, came under the direct rule of the bishop of Verona and subsequently the municipality of the city, on February 27, 1208. The period that followed saw the Venetian lordships alternate with the dominion of Legnago. Ezzelino III da Romano conquered the city in 1231, annexing it to the domains of the March of Treviso. A subsequent insurrection by the Legnago people freed the town from the “tyrant” Ezzelino, and full independence was recognized for the town in 1259 by the lord of Ferrara, Azzo VII d'Este.

This independence was short-lived. With the rise of the Della Scala family at the end of the 13th century, the town returned under the dominion of Verona (1277). Only the intervention of Gian Galeazzo Visconti, lord of Milan, opened a new window of freedom a century later. Having defeated the Scaliger army, the Visconti family granted freedom to the municipalities of Legnago and Porto on August 3, 1390. It was during this period that the Fortress, damaged by numerous wars, underwent a complete restructuring. The work carried out at the end of the 14th century transformed the building into a fortification, the remains of which (the Torrione) are still visible today.

The twilight of the Middle Ages saw the increasingly unstoppable power of Venice impose itself on the area. The maritime republic definitively wrested the twin fortresses from the quarreling local lords on July 12, 1405, after the Scaligeri and Carraresi families had briefly dominated the area. Venetian domination, which began at the start of the 15th century and only ended with the French domination of 1796, brought new tensions and wars to the region. One of the most disastrous events for the Venetian town was the union of the Serenissima with the League of Cambrai on May 14, 1509. Legnago's strategic position on the Adige river and the presence of two mighty fortresses made the town a key point in the war, as well as an epicenter for the defense of the Venetian hinterland. It was on that occasion that a new layer of fortifications was built to reinforce the previous walls that had been there since the Middle Ages. This intervention was not enough to save the fortress from the devastation of the conflict. In 1517, Venice, Spain, England and France signed an armistice that put an end to eight years of bloody fighting. By virtue of this, Verona and its territory - including Legnago - were ceded to France, which in turn ceded them again to Venice.

At the dawn of the 16th century, Legnago was a heap of rubble. The Fortress of Porto was already in a state of decay, while that of Legnago had deteriorated to such an extent that Venice decided to demolish it completely, leaving only two towers intact.

=== The 16th-century walls ===
Reconstruction was slow and difficult. Several reconstruction plans were rejected by the commissions in charge. It was only in 1528 that a final project was approved for the construction of new walls and the transformation of the ruins that had been the town. The Veronese architect Michele Sanmicheli designed and supervised the reconstruction work, which continued until 1540. Sanmicheli, who had already designed numerous buildings throughout the Verona area (including the Porta Nuova project and the renovation of the Bevilaqua Castle), designed a modern defensive system. With five gates and a new circle of walls that extended around the entire town on both banks of the Adige, the new ramparts transformed the town into a true modern-day stronghold.

The events that followed the great reconstruction of the sixteenth century saw a progressive decline of the fortress-city throughout the seventeenth and eighteenth centuries. The economic crisis due to the huge debts of the citizens was compounded by the ever-increasing decline of Venetian power in Italy and Europe. In the last decades of the 18th century, the aristocracy of the Serenissima realized their undeniable weakness. Wanting to survive by any means possible, they took stricter control of the mainland dominions, revoking the last effective remnants of apparent autonomy from the communities (including that of Legnago).

Legnago became a French dominion on July 8, 1796, when Napoleonic troops that had been raging throughout northern Italy for months occupied the fortress. On July 10, Napoleon entered the city, greeted with fear by the citizens, already terrorized by the clashes that had taken place previously. From that moment until the truce that took place with the Treaty of Campo Formio on October 17, 1797, the situation remained very unstable. Clashes between the French and Austrians continued for the following months, while Venice gradually lost more and more ground in the Venetian hinterland. Campoformio, a turning point in the campaign, represents the most important break in the historical territorial unity of the Legnago area. The border between the newborn Cisalpine Republic (French) and the Veneto (under Austrian domination) was established along the Adige river up to its junction with the Canal Bianco. The fortress, until then the only one, was divided in two: the left bank, with the fortress of Porto, thus came under Austrian domination, while the right bank and the fortress of Legnago remained in French hands. The division agreed upon in the treaty was modified on February 9, 1801 with the treaty of Lunéville (after Napoleon's second campaign in northern Italy) moving the border between the two states to the entire course of the Adige, from its source to its mouth. In the same year, work began on reinforcing the walls and building an entrenched camp. The construction work, which required the demolition of a large number of buildings, proceeded slowly and was only partially completed in 1813. Legnago and Porto remained two separate towns throughout the period of Napoleonic domination in Italy.

With the fall of Napoleon, the Congress of Vienna put an end to the almost twenty-year French occupation. In 1815, Legnago and Porto once again became two parts of a single fortified town, within the borders of a single state. Veneto was assigned to the Austrian Empire, which placed its territories within the borders of the Kingdom of Lombardy-Venetia. The presence of 16th century ramparts made Legnago a fundamental strategic point and, by virtue of this advantage, it became part of the Quadrilatero, together with the other three fortresses of Verona, Mantua and Peschiera. During the Austrian domination, various barracks, an arsenal and a military hospital were built in the town.

The fortress of Legnago became once again a strategic point in the Veneto region during the whole period of the Risorgimento. From 1919, the fortress was reinforced with temporary works and put on a state of alert. In the same year it was elevated to a second degree military post. The works proved to be particularly necessary during the First and Second Wars of Independence, when the fortresses of the Quadrilatero were extensively used for military operations. In 1948, the town of Legnago was involved in the uprisings that affected the whole of Europe and spent the following years reinforcing its fortifications. The insurrections began on March 20th, but its freedom was short-lived: fifteen days later it was occupied again by the Austrians, who brought the town back under imperial rule.

The Austrian presence in Legnago and throughout the Veneto region lasted throughout the Second War of Independence and lasted until October 3, 1866. With the Treaty of Vienna, the Austrian Empire ceded the Veneto region to Napoleon III's Second French Empire, who in turn handed it over to Victor Emmanuel II, to be united with the Kingdom of Italy. On October 11, 1866, General Le Boeuf, on behalf of the Emperor of the French, handed over the key to the fortress to Pietro Avrese from Legnago.

== Demolition ==
In the years following the annexation to the Kingdom of Italy, Legnago grew considerably outside the walls of Sanmicheli. There was a need to expand the town and improve road and rail links with the surrounding villages. The town walls were finally demolished in 1887, following the disastrous flooding of the Adige in 1882, which devastated many homes. Already damaged by the river flooding, the walls were not restored. When the military command had to decide whether or not to repair the ancient ramparts, they came to the conclusion that, since Legnago had lost its strategic importance, it wasn't necessary to restore them. The first part to be demolished in 1887 was the stretch from Porta Mantova to Porta Ferrara. In the following years, the rest of the fortifications were torn down to make room for new buildings, both around Legnago and in Porto, on the opposite bank of the river.

Today, only short stretches of the Sanmicheli walls remain. A portion of the walls that has remained intact is located in the area that once housed the Peternella Cellars, to the south-east of the center. The remains of the San Martino Bastion are located under the Canossian Institute, and are not accessible to the public. Further sections were recovered through subsequent excavations and are now visible in Via Matteotti and Via Leopardi.

== The 2004 excavations ==
In 2004, following some work carried out by the Municipality of Legnago to renovate Corso della Vittoria, the remains of the foundations of Porta Mantova came to light, having been hidden under the road surface until then. The site was in a good state of conservation and occupied an area of about 380 square meters. The gate, faced with white Veronese stone, had been demolished in 1887 together with the stretch of wall that, starting from it, reached Porta Ferrara, to the south. Corso della Vittoria remained closed from 2003 to 2011, exposing the remains of its past to the Legnago community. In December 2011, however, the ruins were buried again by order of the city council. The operation was probably due to the need to improve traffic flow in the city center: the area occupied by the excavations was in fact covered with protective sheets and buried, making space for traffic. The roadway that still occupies the excavation site is paved with white Vicenza stone, porphyry and cobblestones. Slabs and cubes were arranged in such a way as to reproduce, on the surface, the plan of the foundations of the ancient gate. The past presence of the ruins is also indicated by an information sign. The road was officially reopened on September 8, 2012.

== See also ==
- Legnago

== Bibliography ==
- Various authors (1867). Album della guerra del 1866 [Album of the war of 1866] (in Italian). Milano: Sonzogno.
- Berro, Ernesto (2010). Legnago, un borgo, una storia [Legnago, a town and its history] (in Italian). Urbana (PD): F.lli Corradin Editori.
- Boscagin, Cirillo (1975a). Legnago nella storia [Legnago in history] (in Italian). Vol. 1. Legnago (VR): Girardi.
- Boscagin, Cirillo (1975b). Legnago nella storia [Legnago in history] (in Italian). Vol. 2. Legnago (VR): Girardi.
- Boscagin, Cirillo (1966). Storia di Legnago [History of Legnago] (in Italian). Verona: Ghidini e Fiorini.
- Facchin, Renato (1984). Tre capitoli di storia legnanese [Three chapters in the history of Legnano] (in Italian). Legnago (VR): Grafiche Stella.
- Fioroni, Maria (2011). Cronache legnanesi 1915-1959 [Chronicles of Legnano 1915-1959] (in Italian). Legnago (VR): Fondazione Fioroni.
- Occhi, Francesco; Garau, Augusto (2008). Legnago, storia di una comunità [Legnago, history of a community] (in Italian). Legnago (VR): Girardi.
- Tomelleri, Francesco (September 8, 2012). "Seppellita Porta Mantova. Il viale torna tutto carrabile" [Porta Mantova buried. The avenue is now fully accessible to vehicles.] (in Italian).
