= Fausto Zonaro =

Italian painter active in the Ottoman Empire (1854–1929)

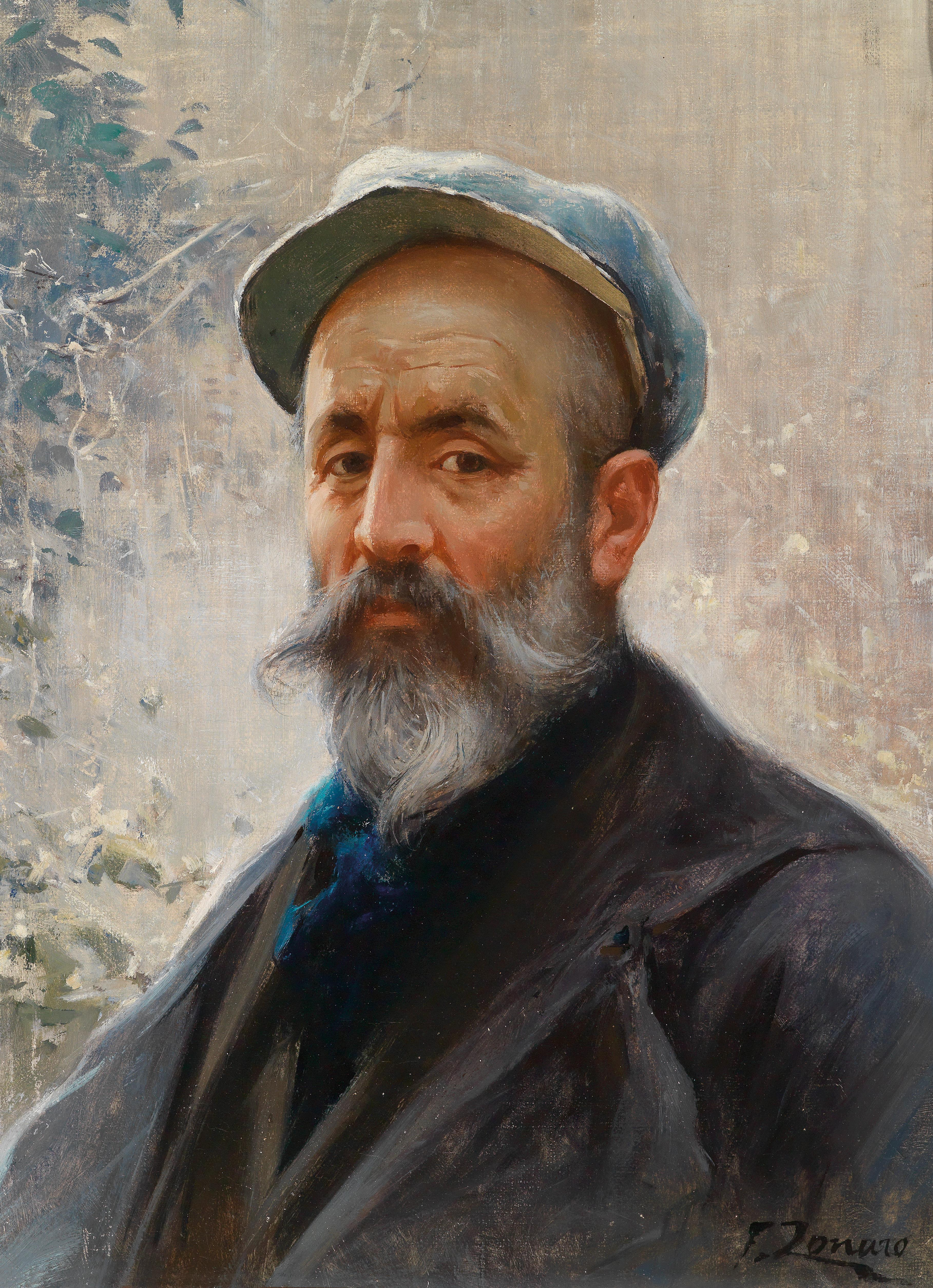
- Self-portrait (1908)
- Born: 18 September 1854; Masi, Padua, Austrian Empire
- Died: 19 July 1929 (aged 74); Sanremo, Italy
- Known for: Painting
- Movement: Orientalism
- Spouse: Elisabetta Pante (m. 1892; sep. 1920)
- Children: 2

Fausto Zonaro (18 September 1854 – 19 July 1929) was an Italian painter, best known for his realist style paintings of life and history of the Ottoman Empire.

== Life ==
=== Young life and early art career ===
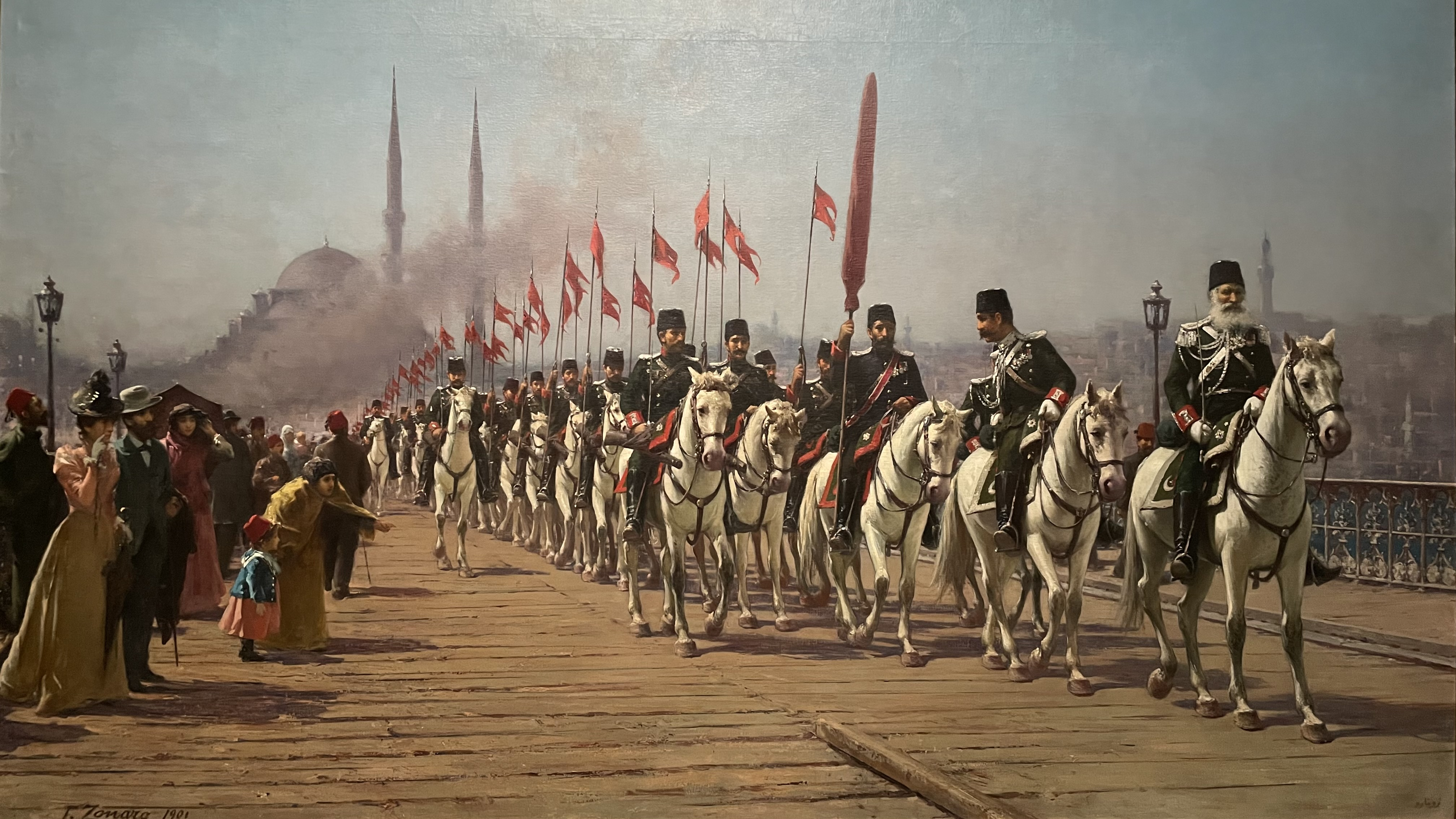
Fausto Zonaro: Il reggimento imperiale di Ertugrul sul ponte di Galata (The Imperial Regiment of Ertugrul on the Galata Bridge)

Fausto Zonaro was born in Masi, a municipality in the Province of Padua, then part of the Austrian Empire. He was the eldest child of the mason Maurizio and his wife Elisabetta Bertoncin. Maurizio intended that his son should also be a mason, yet at a young age, Fausto showed a great ability at drawing. With his parents’ consent, he enrolled first in the Technical Institute in Lendinara, then in the Cignaroli Academy in Verona under Napoleone Nani. Fausto opened a small art school and studio in Venice, but traveled often to Naples as well. He felt no clear direction in his life at that time.

He actively displayed works in exhibition and gained respect of critics. He painted mainly genre works in oil and watercolor. In 1883 at Milan, he exhibited: Le rivelatrici napoletane; Da Sant'Elmo, and Al Pincio; in Rome, the canvases Passa la vacca; La sofferente; Le cucitrici napoletane, and Il saponaro. In 1884, at Turin: Tempesta; Primo nato; Primo tuono, and the Zoccolaro of Naples; and in 1887 at Venice: In attesa; Al Redentoretto, and Lavoratrice di perle. La casa Camerini of Padua once possessed a banditore; and two canvases: I pigiatori and In medio stat virtus.

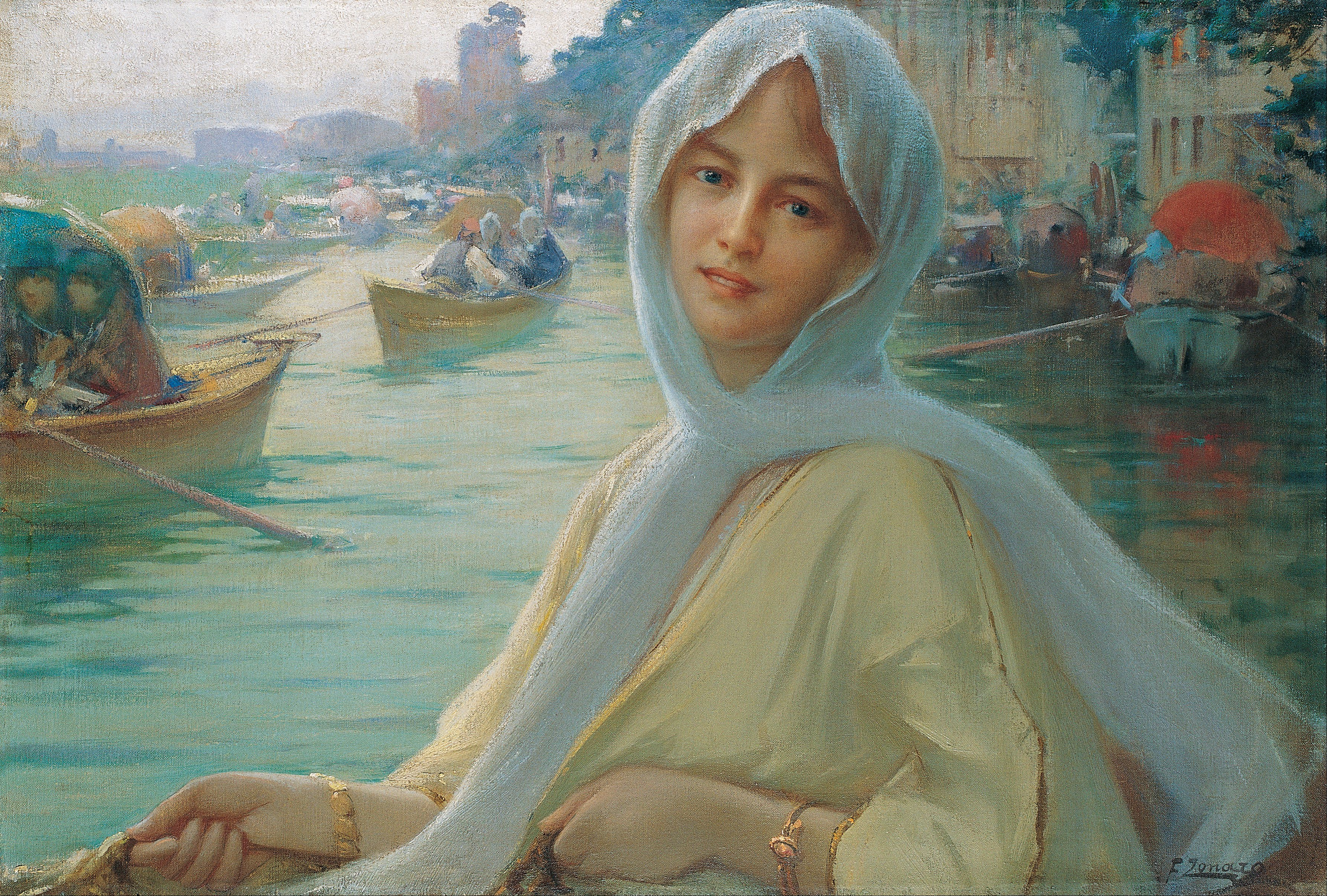
On the Göksu Deresi (showing Zonaro's wife Elisabetta)

The turning point in Zonaro's career occurred however in 1891, when he fell in love with photographer Elisabetta Pante (1863-1946), a pupil of his in Venice, and together they traveled to Istanbul, capital of the Ottoman Empire, inspired in part by Edmondo de Amicis’ orientalist travel book Constantinopoli.

=== Constantinople ===
In 1892, Zonaro and Pante married, and lived in the Constantinople neighborhood of Pera. The couple had two children together, a son named Fausto Jr. and a daughter named Yolanda.

Over time he gained patronage in Constantinople's aristocratic circles. While teaching painting to the wife of Munir Pasha, the Minister of Protocol, Zonaro and Pante got to know the important artistic figures of Istanbul of that time, including Osman Hamdi Bey. In 1896 he was nominated as the court painter (Ottoman Turkish: Ressam-ı Hazret-i Şehriyari) to Abdulhamid II thanks to the intervention of the Russian ambassador who had introduced the sultan to Zonaro's work, Il reggimento imperiale di Ertugrul sul ponte di Galata (in English: The Imperial Regiment of Ertugrul on the Galata Bridge), which he then purchased.

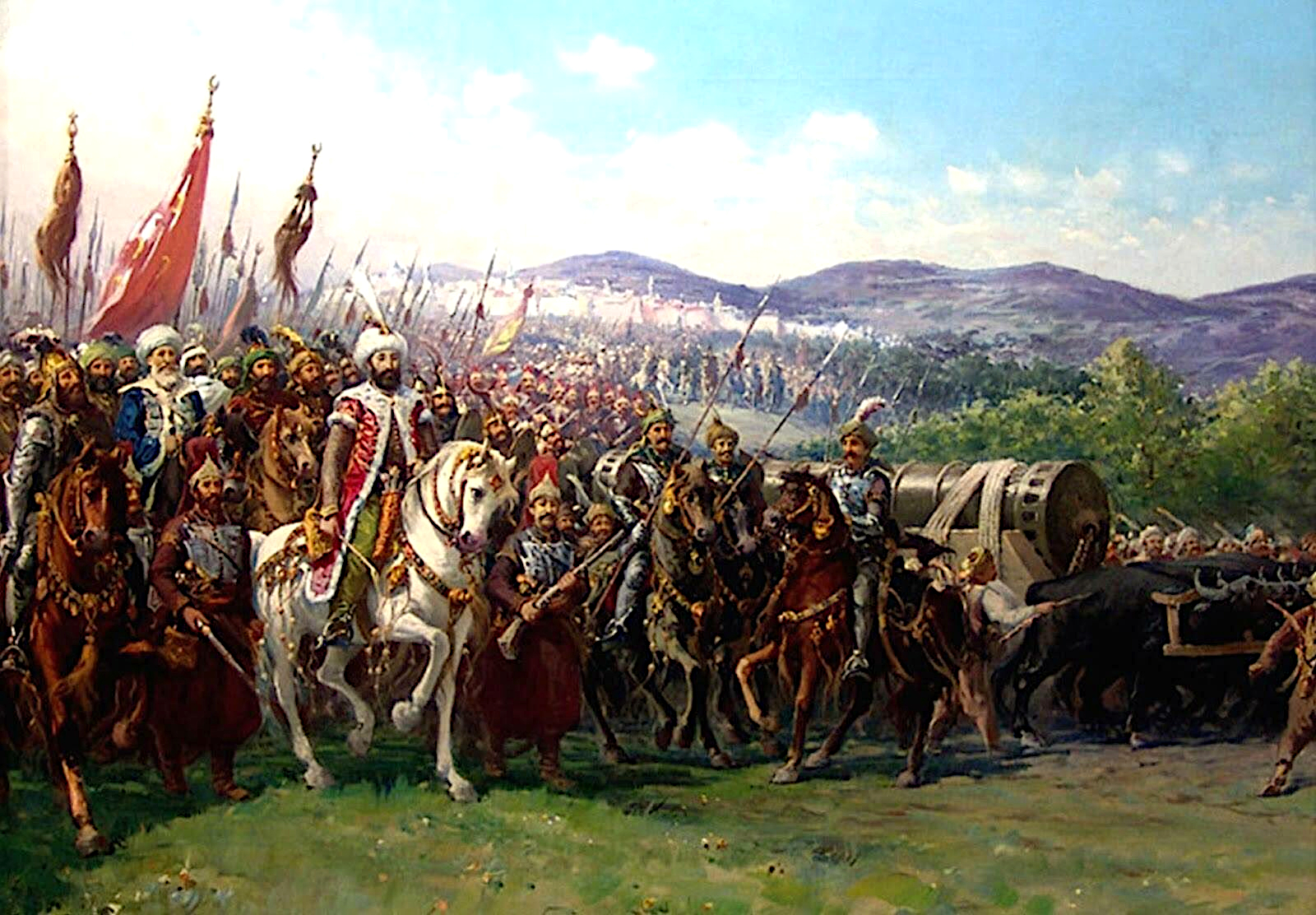
Fausto Zonaro: Mehmed II and the Ottoman Army approaching Constantinople, transporting a giant cannon.

The Sultan later commissioned a series of paintings depicting events in the life of the 15th-century Ottoman sultan, Mehmed II. As court painter, Zonaro viewed himself as the successor to the Venetian painter Gentile Bellini, who had been commissioned by Mehmed II to paint his portrait over 400 years earlier.

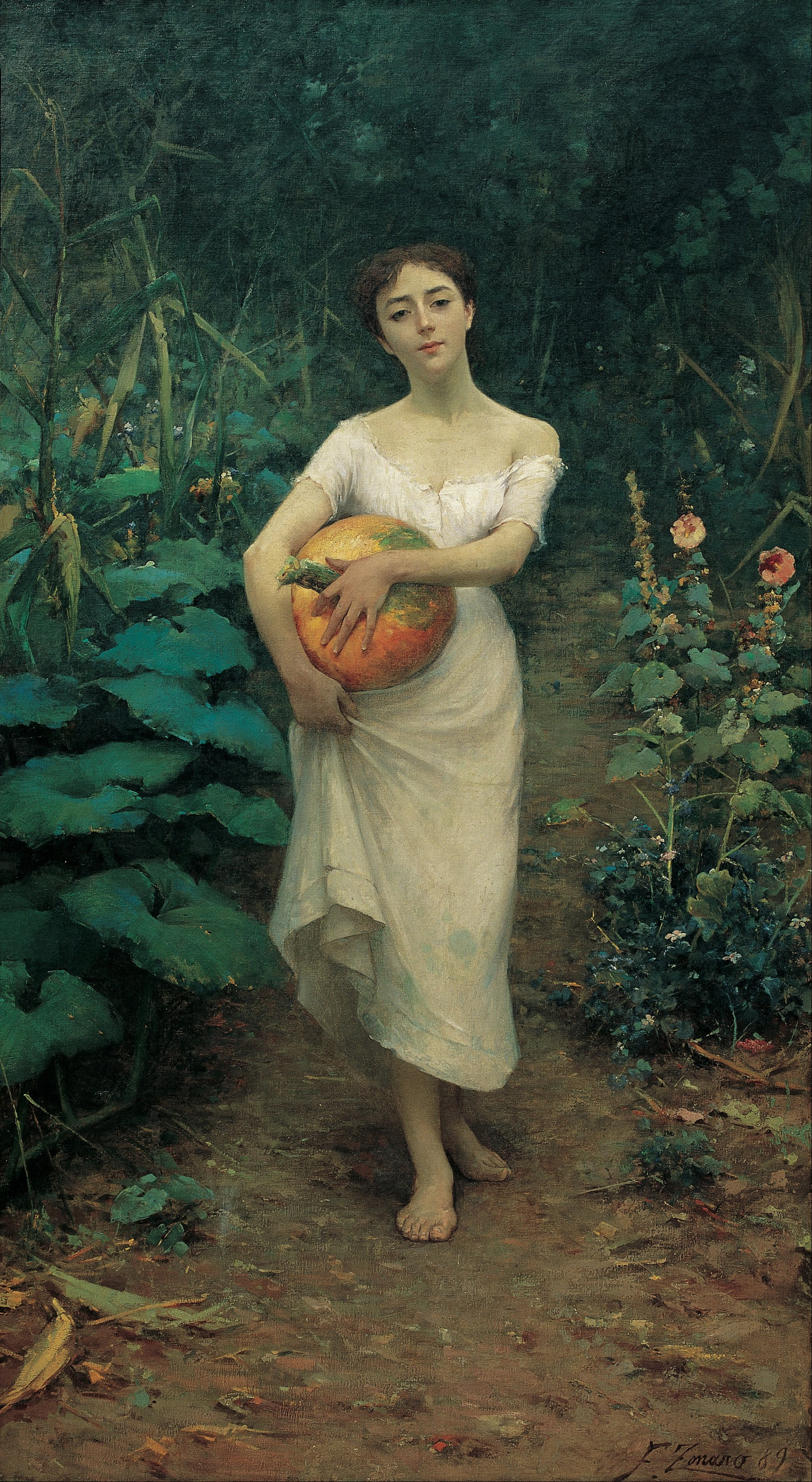
Fausto Zonaro: Young Girl Carrying a Pumpkin, 1889

=== Return to Italy ===
Zonaro remained in Istanbul until 1909, then returned to Italy after the Young Turk Revolution that overthrew his patron Abdulhamid II and made Ottoman Empire a constitutional monarchy. There would be no further Ottoman court painters after him. He settled in Sanremo where, until his death, he continued to produce small paintings of the Italian Riviera and the nearby French Riviera, as well as nostalgic scenes of the Bosphorus to assuage his yearning for Istanbul.

In 1920 he separated from his wife and began living with his daughter Yolanda. Nine years later, he died. He is buried in the Foce Cemetery in Sanremo. On his gravestone, beneath an Ottoman tughra, it states that Zonaro was the court painter of the Ottoman Empire.

== Artistic work and reputation ==
A prolific artist who created hundreds of works, Zonaro painted portraits, landscapes and historical paintings, mostly of the Ottoman Empire. He is said to have been "one of those who made a major contribution to the development of western-style art in Turkey.” An exhibition of his work in Florence in 1977 "received wide acclaim in the art world".

He remains highly regarded in Turkey for his paintings of historical events in Ottoman history, as well as capturing scenes of everyday life in the sunset years of the empire. Today, most of Zonaro's works are displayed in Istanbul's leading museums, including in the Topkapı Palace, the Dolmabahçe Palace and the Istanbul Military Museum. Others of his works can be seen in the private Sakıp Sabancı Museum and Pera Museum. A number of his paintings belong to private collectors in Turkey.

== Gallery ==
Some of Zonaro's paintings are in the Pera Museum in Istanbul (Daughter of the English Ambassador Riding in a Palanquin) and the Istanbul Museum of Modern Art.

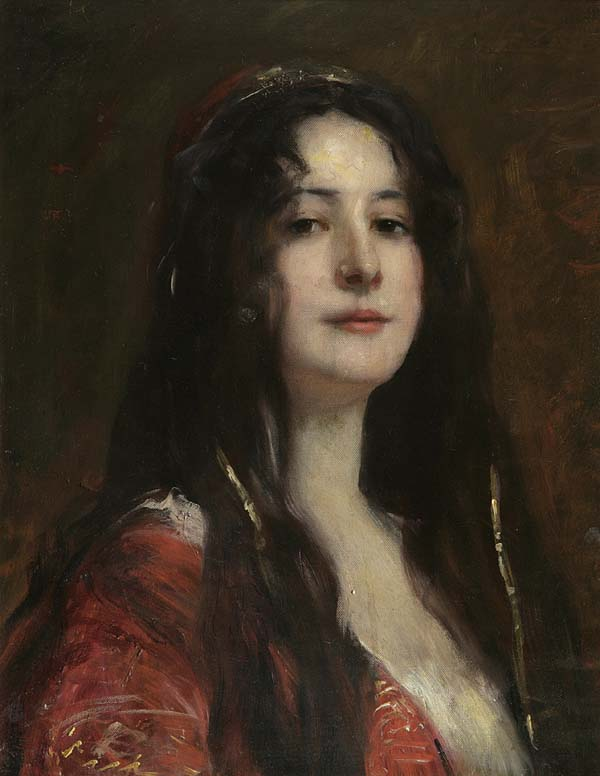
Türkisches Mädchen

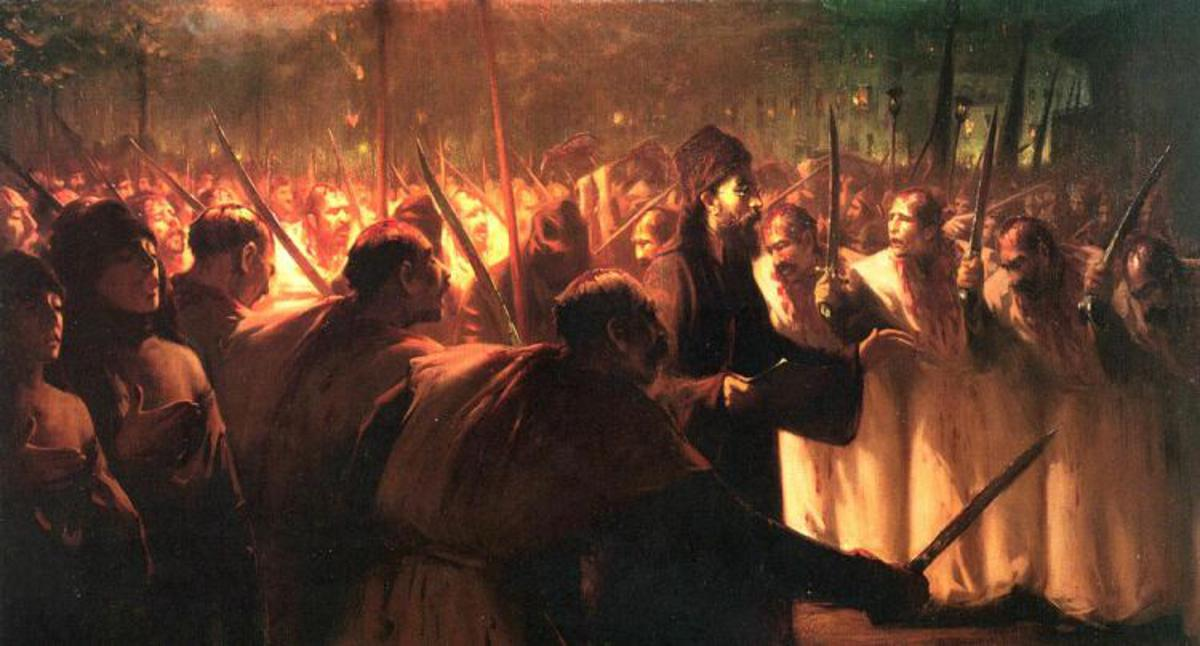
10th of Muharram

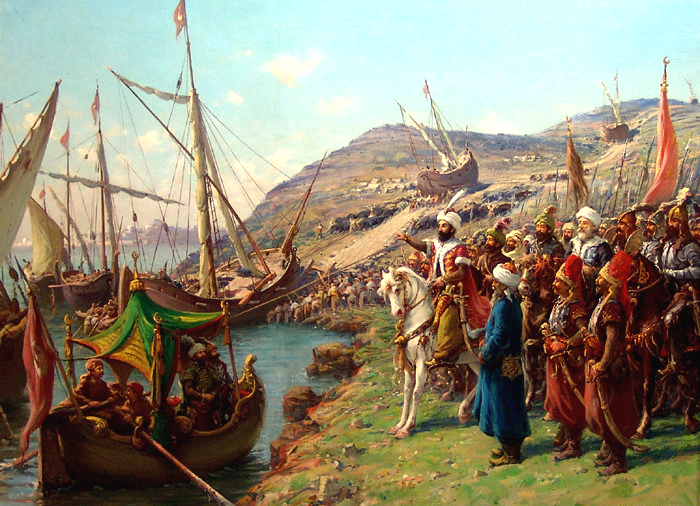
Mehmed II at the Siege of Constantinopole

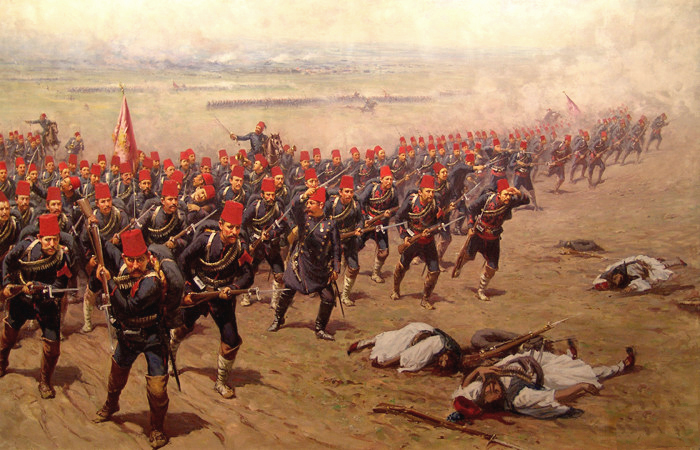
The Attack (1896)

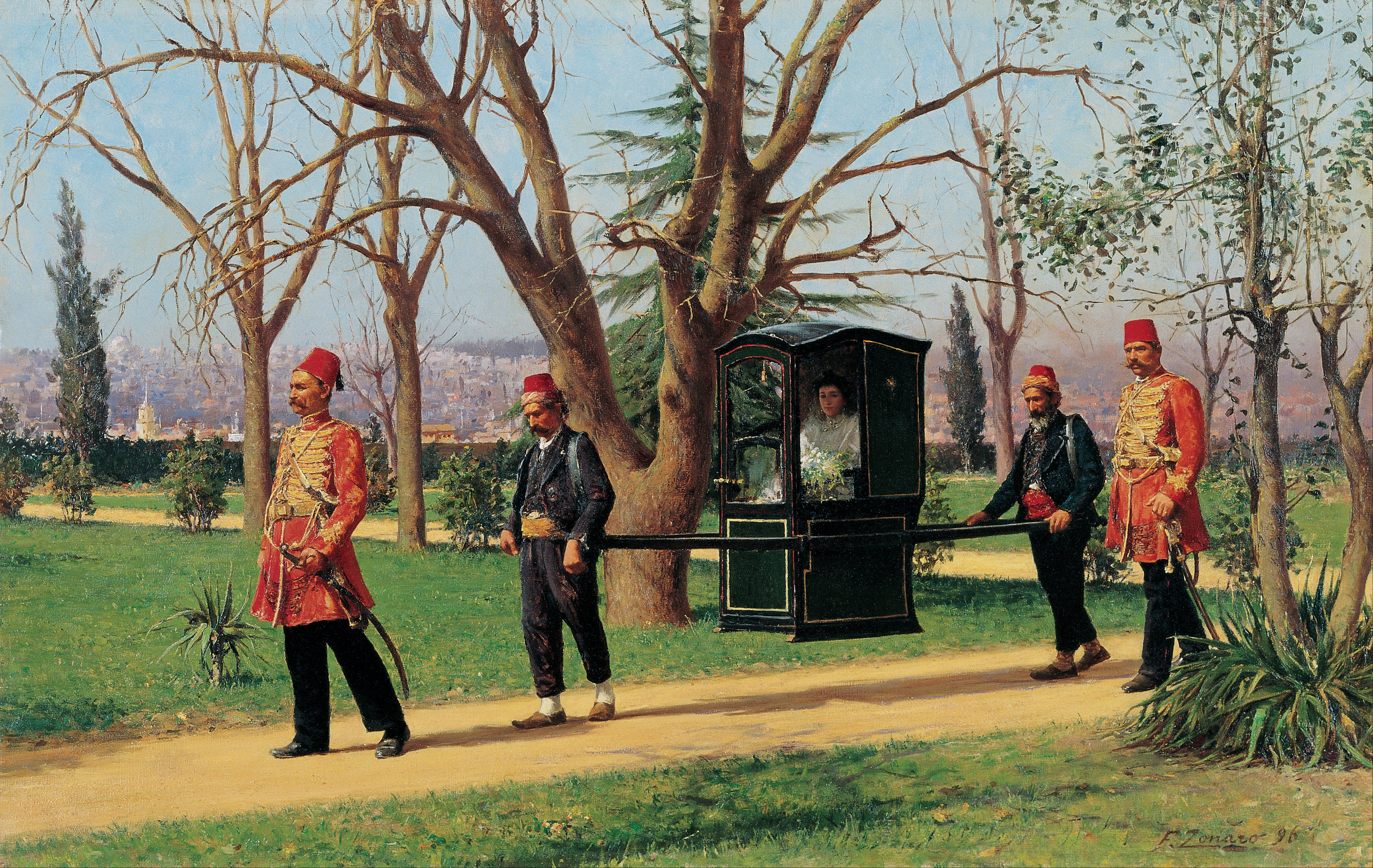
The Daughter of the English Ambassador Riding in a Palanquin

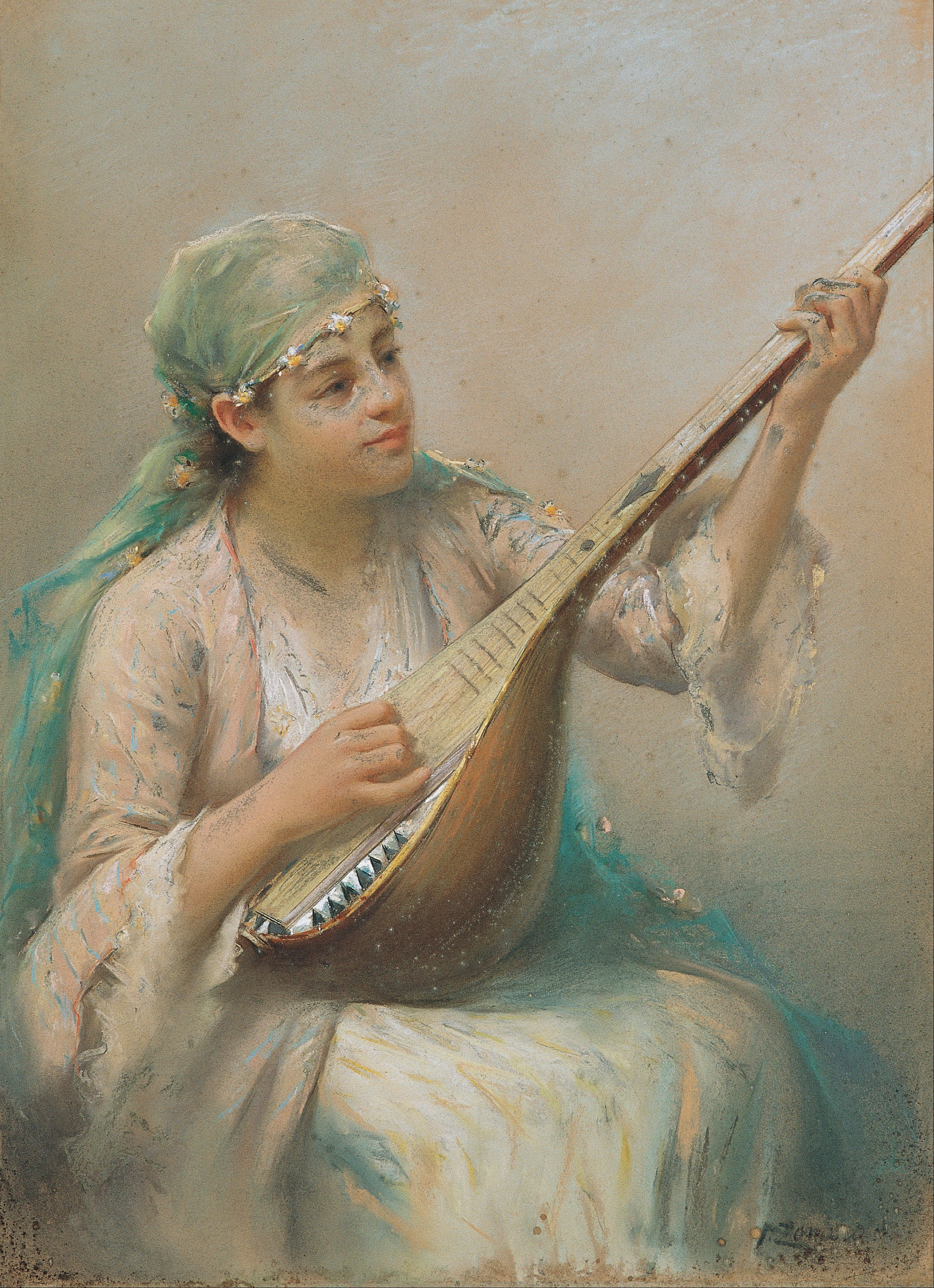
Woman Playing a String Instrument

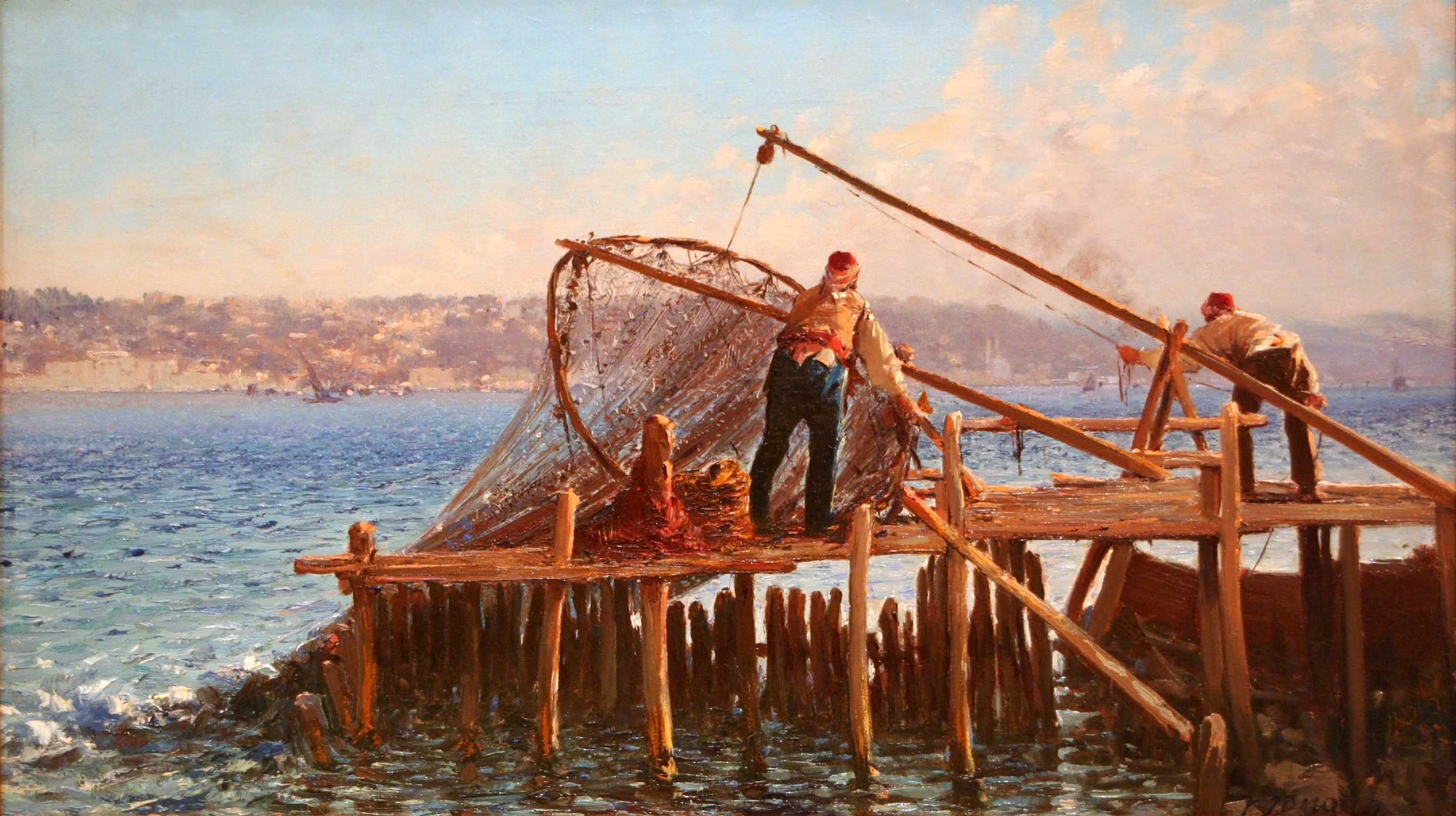
Fishermen Bringing in the Catch (1891 - 1910)

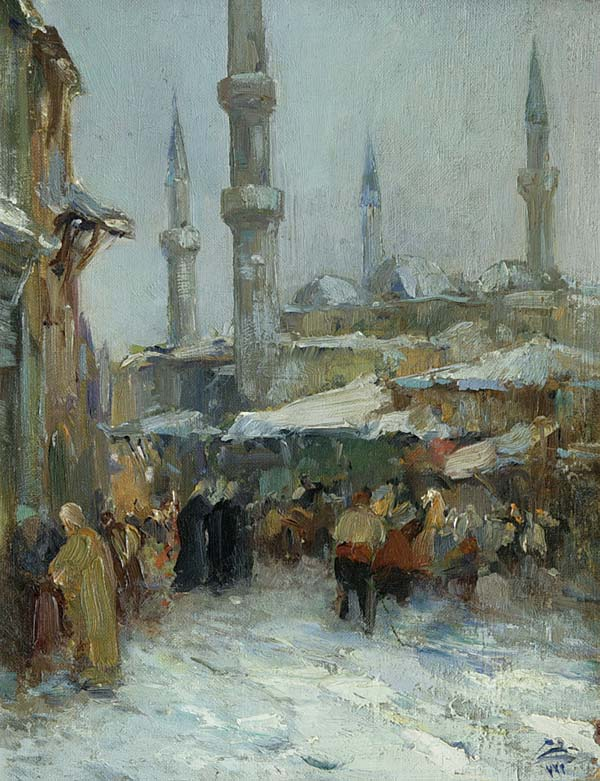
Istanbul, Winter

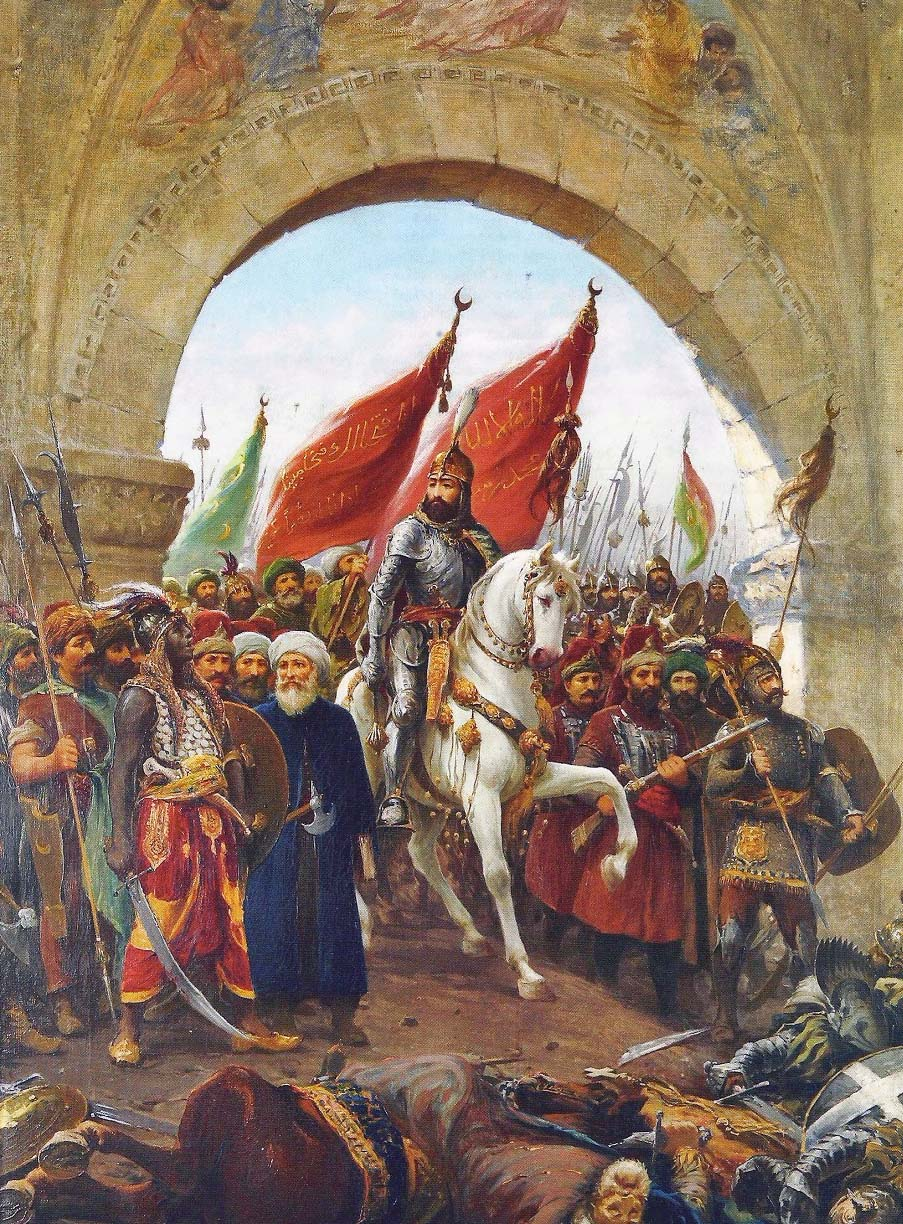
Mehmed II Entering Constantinople

== See also ==
- List of Orientalist artists
- Orientalism

== Sources ==
- Fausto Zonaro page it:Fausto Zonaro on the Italian Wikipedia
- Fausto Zonaro page tr:Fausto Zonaro on the Turkish Wikipedia (Vikipedi)
- Studies site Osmanlı Araştırmaları
- faustozonaro.it, site dedicated to the artist (in Italian).
- Constantinople City of the World’s Desire 1453-1924 by Philip Mansel
- Un pittore Veneto Bizantino, Cronache della civiltà elleno-Latina, Rivista Quindicinale, Volume 11, Fasc VII-VIII, (1903) author Angelo De Gubernatis, page 123–125.
