= Castelbaldo =

- Comune
- Comune di Castelbaldo
- Location within Italy Location within Veneto
- Coordinates: 45°8′N 11°27′E
- Country: Italy
- Region: Veneto
- Province: Padua (PD)

Government
  - Mayor: Riccardo Berardinello

Area
  - Total: 15.17 km^{2} (5.86 sq mi)
- Elevation: 12 m (39 ft)

Population (31 August 2021)
  - Total: 1,421
  - Density: 93.67/km^{2} (242.6/sq mi)
- Demonym: Castelbaldesi
- Time zone: UTC+1 (CET)
  - Summer (DST): UTC+2 (CEST)
- Postal code: 35040
- Dialing code: 0425
- Website: Official website

Castelbaldo is a comune (municipality) in the Province of Padua in the Italian region Veneto, located about 80 kilometres (50 miles) southwest of Venice and about 45 km (28 mi) southwest of Padua.

Castelbaldo borders the following municipalities: Badia Polesine, Masi, Merlara, Terrazzo.

== History ==
The commune's history dates back to 1292, when the Paduans built a castle on the left back of the Adige river. Its name is derived from both the Italian word for castle and the name of Padua's Podesta during the time of its construction, Lambertuccio de' Frescobaldi.

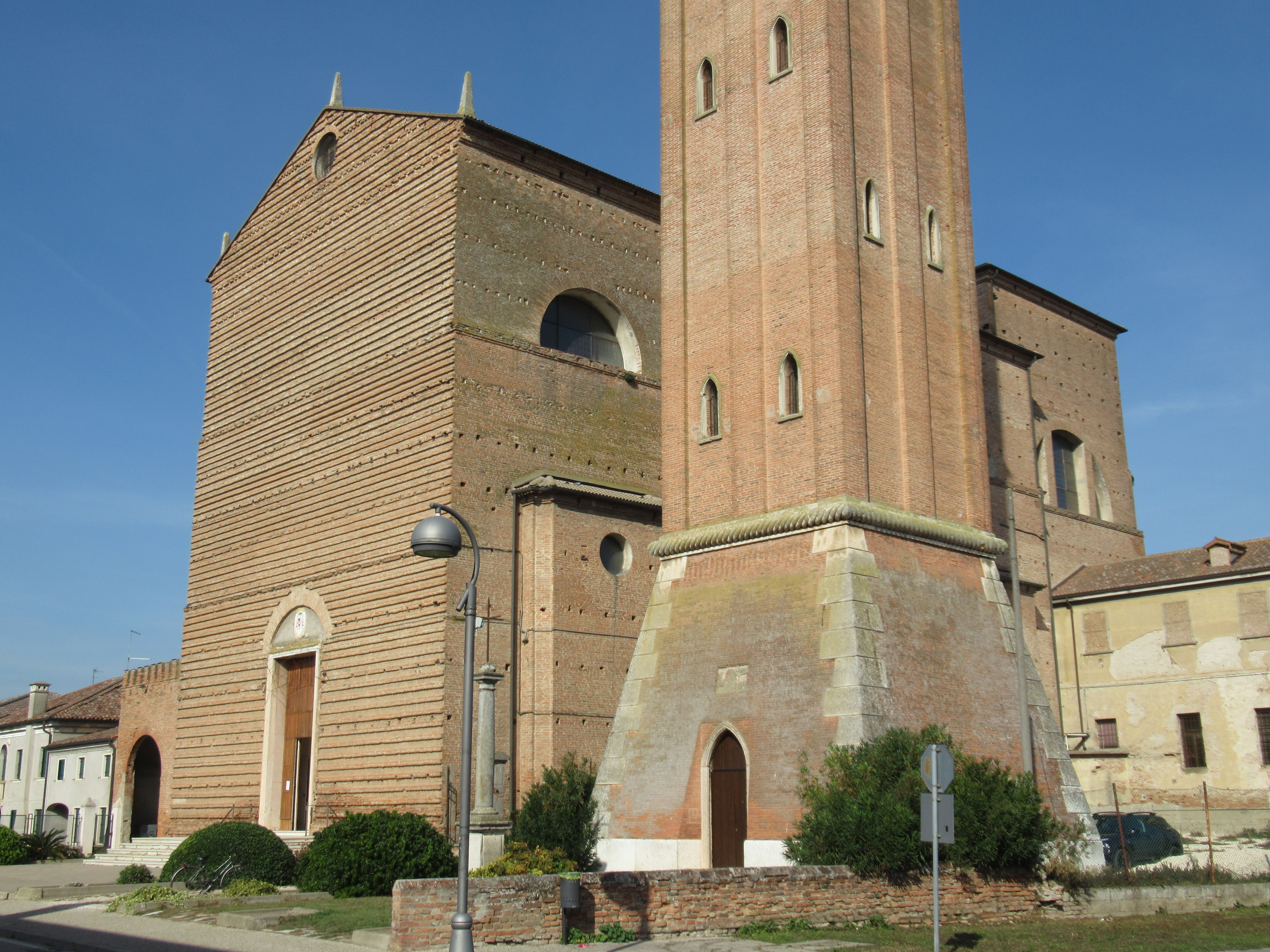
Archbishop of San Prosdocimo Church in Castelbaldo
