= Castagnaro =

- Comune
- Comune di Castagnaro
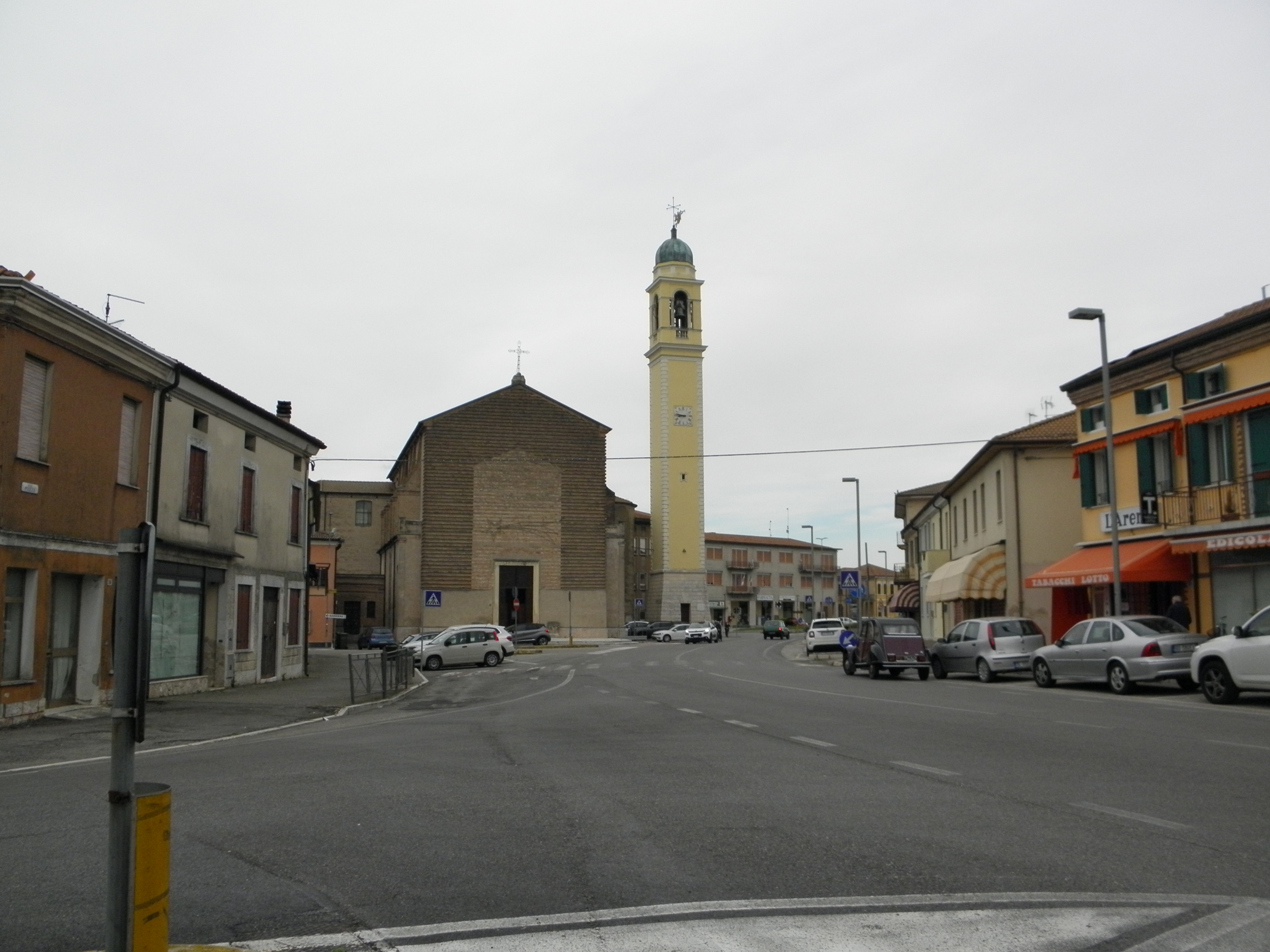

- Location within Italy Location within Veneto
- Coordinates: 45°7′N 11°25′E
- Country: Italy
- Region: Veneto
- Province: Province of Verona (VR)
- Frazioni: Menà, Vallestrema

Area
  - Total: 34.7 km^{2} (13.4 sq mi)
- Elevation: 14 m (46 ft)

Population (Dec. 2004)
  - Total: 4,091
  - Density: 118/km^{2} (305/sq mi)
- Demonym: Castagnaresi
- Time zone: UTC+1 (CET)
  - Summer (DST): UTC+2 (CEST)
- Postal code: 37043, 37040 frazioni
- Dialing code: 0442

Castagnaro is a comune (municipality) in the Province of Verona in the Italian region Veneto, located about 80 kilometres (50 mi) southwest of Venice and about 50 kilometres (31 mi) southeast of Verona. As of 31 December 2004, it had a population of 4,091 and an area of 34.7 square kilometres (13.4 mi^{2}).

The municipality of Castagnaro contains the frazioni (subdivisions, mainly villages and hamlets) Menà and Vallestrema.

Castagnaro borders the following municipalities: Badia Polesine, Giacciano con Baruchella, Terrazzo, and Villa Bartolomea.

Castagnaro is also the sight of one of the most famous battles of the condottieri era.

== Demographic evolution ==
Historical population

Year	Pop.	±%
1861	?	—
1871	4,027	—
1881	4,740	+17.7%
1901	5,231	+10.4%
1911	5,997	+14.6%

Year	Pop.	±%
1921	5,996	−0.0%
1931	6,330	+5.6%
1936	6,449	+1.9%
1951	6,733	+4.4%
1961	5,088	−24.4%

Year	Pop.	±%
1971	4,618	−9.2%
1981	4,578	−0.9%
1991	4,319	−5.7%
2001	4,151	−3.9%

Source: Data from ISTAT

== Twin towns ==
Castagnaro is twinned with:

- Fischbachau, Germany
