= Villa Bartolomea =

- Comune
- Comune di Villa Bartolomea
- Location within Italy Location within Veneto
- Coordinates: 45°9′N 11°21′E
- Country: Italy
- Region: Veneto
- Province: Verona (VR)
- Frazioni: Carpi d'Adige, San Zeno in Valle, Spinimbecco

Government
  - Mayor: Andrea Tuzza

Area
  - Total: 53.3 km^{2} (20.6 sq mi)
- Elevation: 14 m (46 ft)

Population (31 December 2015)
  - Total: 4,821
  - Density: 90.5/km^{2} (234/sq mi)
- Demonym: Villani or Bortoloti
- Time zone: UTC+1 (CET)
  - Summer (DST): UTC+2 (CEST)
- Postal code: 37049
- Dialing code: 0442
- Patron saint: St. Bartholomew
- Saint day: August 24
- Website: Official website

Villa Bartolomea is a comune (municipality) in the Province of Verona in the Italian region Veneto, located about 80 kilometres (50 mi) southwest of Venice and about 45 kilometres (28 mi) southeast of Verona.

Villa Bartolomea borders the following municipalities: Castagnaro, Castelnovo Bariano, Giacciano con Baruchella, Legnago, and Terrazzo.

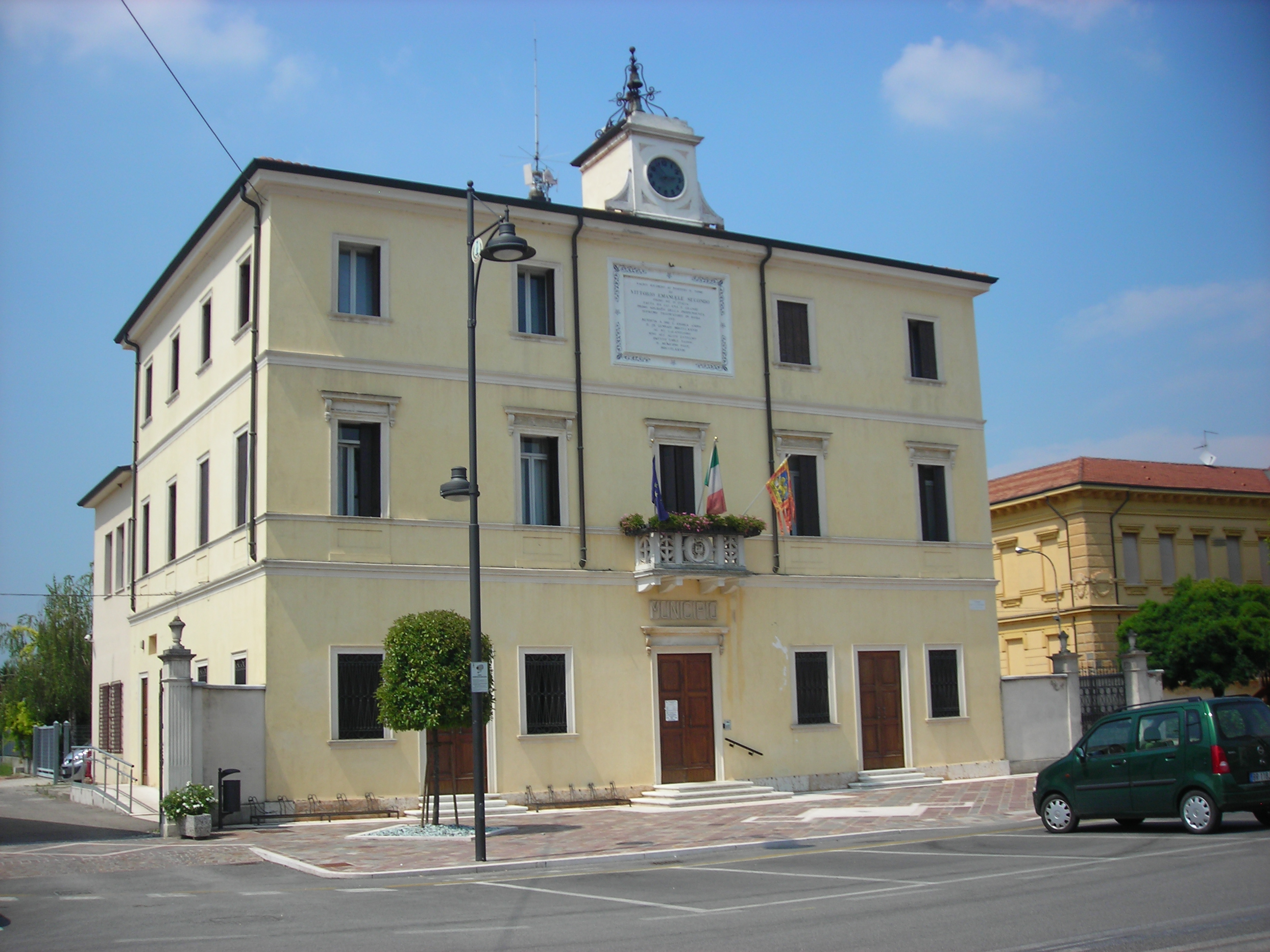
Villa Bartolomea, the former municipal building
