= Luigi Chiatti =

Italian murderer

- Born: Antonio Rossi; 27 February 1968 (age 58); Narni, Italy
- Other name: "The Monster of Foligno"
- Conviction: Murder
- Penalty: Two life sentences; commuted to 30 years imprisonment

Details
- Victims: 2
- Span of crimes: 1992–1993
- Country: Italy
- Date apprehended: 8 August 1993

Luigi Chiatti (born 27 February 1968 in Narni) is an Italian murderer, named "The Monster of Foligno" by the media.

== Biography ==
Born Antonio Rossi to mother Marisa Rossi, a young maid who, unable to provide for her son, abandoned him shortly after his birth. He spent his first years in an orphanage near Narni until his sixth birthday when he was adopted by the physician Ermanno Chiatti and his consort Giacoma Ponti, a resident of Foligno. When his adoption became official on 13 June 1975, his name was changed to Luigi Chiatti.

== Events ==
On the afternoon of 4 October 1992, one Sunday, little Simone Allegretti (4 years old) disappeared in the countryside between Foligno and Bevagna; his lifeless body was found two days later along an escarpment, not far from where he had disappeared. Shortly before the corpse was found, in a telephone booth in front of the railway station, in the centre of Foligno, a note was found that claimed the murder and provided precise details on where the body was and what the clothing was. The note also asserted the murderer's willingness to strike again.

The police headquarters of Perugia activated a toll-free number and a note was issued to the killer. On 13 October a man called the toll-free number several times identifying himself as the "Monster of Foligno". Thanks to these phone calls, its users were traced, leading to the identification of Stefano Spilotros, a young Lombard real estate agent. In the face of inconsistencies and testimonies of Spilotros' friends and relatives, who said that on Sunday he was with them in Rodano, near Milan, a further autopsy was arranged on the victim's body, which excluded his guilt, revealing him to be a mythomaniac.

The strong climate of hysteria created around the story created other similar situations: a young worker from the province of Macerata hanged himself, leaving a note saying "I am the monster, forgive me".

On 7 August 1993, the real monster struck again: the corpse of 13-year-old Lorenzo Paolucci was found shortly after the crime and was only 30 feet from the villa inhabited by Chiatti. The tracks led straight to the house where Luigi Chiatti was subsequently captured. He almost immediately confessed to the murder, also admitting to the murder of Simone Allegretti.

== Trial ==
On 1 December 1994, the trial against Luigi Chiatti, accused of the murder of Simone Allegretti and Lorenzo Paolucci, began. On 28 December of the same year, he was sentenced to two life sentences.

== Appeal and Supreme Court ==
On 11 April 1996, the Court of Appeal of Perugia reformed the sentence of the first instance, declaring Chiatti semi-mentally ill and condemned him to 30 years of imprisonment. Finally, on 4 March 1997, the Supreme Court of Cassation upheld the sentence, thus imposing the sentence on the court final. Among the testimonies brought by the defence, there was an orphanage companion of Chiatti who stated that he himself, along with Chiatti, were sexually abused by a priest.

He served his sentence in the prison of Prato, Tuscany. He had asked twice for prize permits, but they were refused. It was rumoured that in June 2009 he was released from prison for a few hours, but the lawyers denied the news. On 3 September 2015 Luigi Chiatti finished his prison sentence, but will have to reside for at least another three years in a Rems (type of structure that since 2015 has replaced the old judicial psychiatric hospitals) in Capoterra, Sardinia. In 2018 and 2020, following evaluation by the Surveillance Court of Cagliari, Chiatti's stay at Rems was both times extended by two years.

== See also ==
- Serial killer
- Monster of Florence
- Donato Bilancia
- Ferdinand Gamper
- Roberto Succo
- Beasts of Satan
- List of serial killers by country
