= Terrazzo, Veneto =

Administrative division of Veneto, Italy

Terrazzo
- Comune
- Comune di Terrazzo
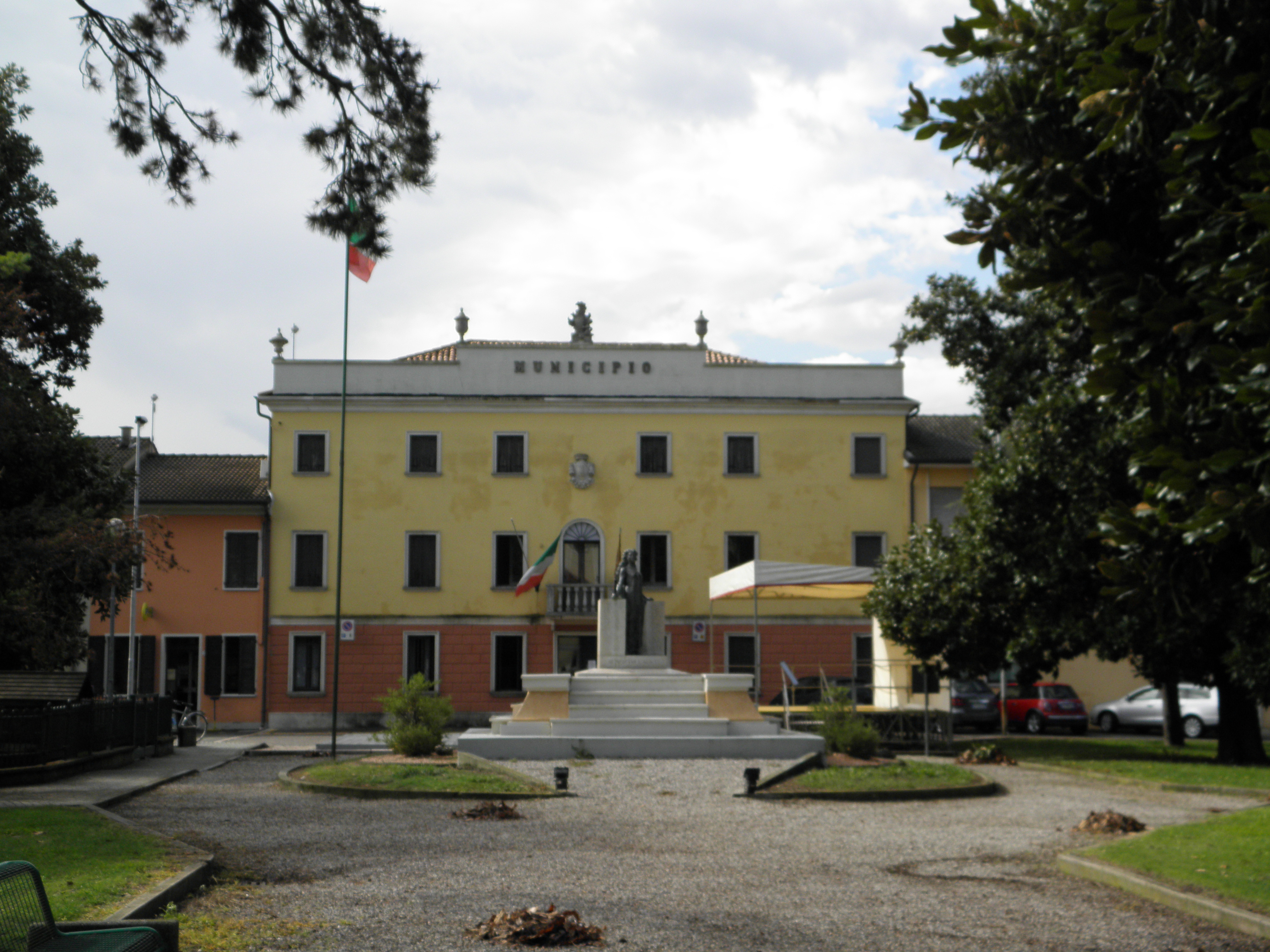
- Town hall.

- Location within Italy Location within Veneto
- Coordinates: 45°10′N 11°24′E
- Country: Italy
- Region: Veneto
- Province: Verona (VR)
- Frazioni: Begosso, Nichesola

Government
  - Mayor: Simone Zamboni

Area
  - Total: 20.53 km^{2} (7.93 sq mi)
- Elevation: 12 m (39 ft)

Population (31 December 2015)
  - Total: 2,242
  - Density: 109.2/km^{2} (282.8/sq mi)
- Demonym: Terrazzani
- Time zone: UTC+1 (CET)
  - Summer (DST): UTC+2 (CEST)
- Postal code: 37040
- Dialing code: 0442
- Patron saint: Saint Paul
- Saint day: 25 January
- Website: Official website

Terrazzo is a comune (municipality) in the Province of Verona in the Italian region Veneto, located about 80 kilometres (50 mi) southwest of Venice and about 45 kilometres (28 mi) southeast of Verona.

Terrazzo borders the following municipalities: Badia Polesine, Bevilacqua, Boschi Sant'Anna, Castagnaro, Castelbaldo, Legnago, Merlara, Urbana, and Villa Bartolomea.

== People ==
- Massimo Bubola (b. 1954), singer-songwriter
- Gianfranco Stevanin, Serial killer (1960)
