= Legnago =

Legnago Lenjago
- Comune
- Città di Legnago
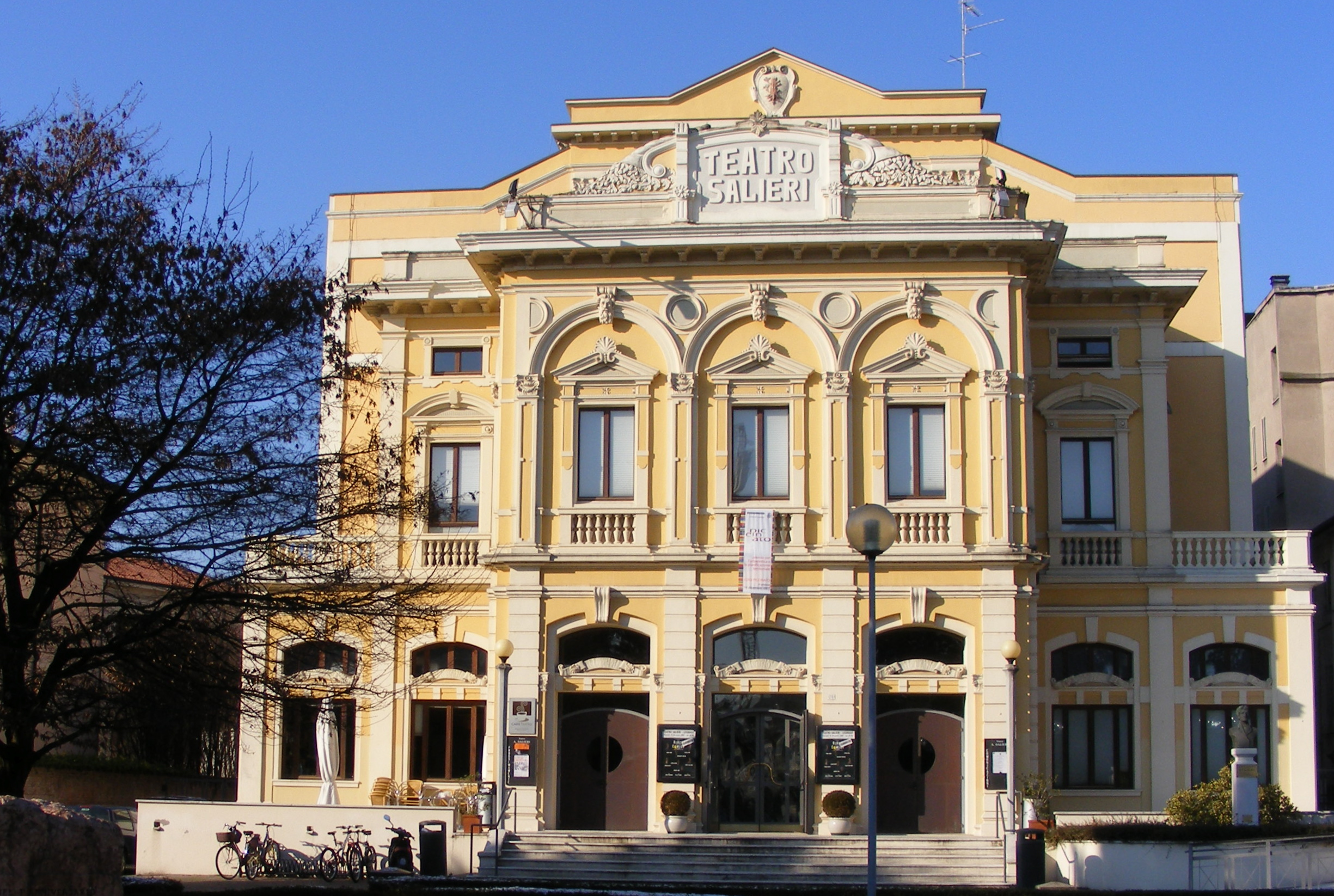
- Teatro Salieri

- Legnago within the Province of Verona

- Location within Italy Location within Veneto
- Coordinates: 45°11′40″N 11°18′45″E
- Country: Italy
- Region: Veneto
- Province: Verona (VR)
- Frazioni: Canove, Casette, Porto, San Pietro, San Vito, Terranegra, Torretta, Vangadizza, Vigo

Government
  - Mayor: Clara Scapin

Area
  - Total: 79.66 km^{2} (30.76 sq mi)
- Elevation: 16 m (52 ft)

Population (31 August 2017)
  - Total: 25,204
  - Density: 316.4/km^{2} (819.5/sq mi)
- Demonym: Legnaghesi
- Time zone: UTC+1 (CET)
  - Summer (DST): UTC+2 (CEST)
- Postal code: 37045, 37040
- Dialing code: 0442
- Patron saint: Saint Martin
- Saint day: November 11
- Website: Official website

Legnago (Italian pronunciation: [leɲˈɲaːɡo]; Venetian: Lenjago) is a town and comune in the Province of Verona, Veneto, northern Italy, with population (2012) of 25,439. It is located on the Adige river, about 43 kilometres (27 mi) from Verona. Its fertile land produces crops of rice, other cereals, sugar, and tobacco.

== History ==
There are traces of human presence in the area date back to the Bronze Age.

Legnago had an important military role since the early Middle Ages. In the 19th century it was one of the Quadrilatero fortresses, the main strongpoint of the Austrian Lombardy-Venetia puppet state during the Italian Wars of Independence. The present fortifications were planned and made in 1815, the older defences having been destroyed by Napoleon I in 1801.

== Geography ==
Located in the southwestern corner of its province, near the borders with the ones of Rovigo, Padua and Vicenza, Legnago borders with the municipalities of Angiari, Bergantino (RO), Bonavigo, Boschi Sant'Anna, Castelnovo Bariano (RO), Cerea, Minerbe, Terrazzo and Villa Bartolomea. It counts the hamlets (frazioni) of Canove, Casette, Porto, San Pietro, San Vito, Terranegra, Torretta, Vangadizza and Vigo.

== Main sights ==
- Church of San Salvaro (12th century).
- Cathedral (Duomo), from the 18th century.
- The Torrione ("Grand Tower"), dating from the 14th century, the only surviving tower from the old medieval walls.

== Culture ==
In honour of Legnago's most famous native, the composer Antonio Salieri, there is a Salieri Opera Festival every autumn sponsored by the Fondazione Culturale Antonio Salieri and dedicated to rediscovering his work and those of his contemporaries. A theatre in Legnago has also been renamed in his honour.

== People ==
- Antonio Salieri (1750–1825), composer and teacher; peer and key rival of Wolfgang Amadeus Mozart
- Giovanni Battista Cavalcaselle (1827–1897), art historian
- Apollo Granforte (1886–1975), operatic baritone
- Alfredo de Palchi (1926–2020), poet and translator
- Paolo Ruberti (born 1975), racing driver

== Sport ==
The local football club is the F.C. Legnago Salus S.S.D.

== See also ==
- Walls of Legnago
