= Donato Bilancia =

Italian serial killer (1951–2020)

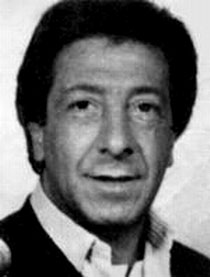
- Bilancia in the early 1990s
- Born: 10 July 1951; Potenza, Italy
- Died: 17 December 2020 (aged 69); Padua, Italy
- Other names: The Liguria Monster; Killer on the Trains; Walter
- Status: Deceased (imprisoned since 1998)
- Convictions: 12 April 2000
- Penalty: 13 terms of life imprisonment

Details
- Victims: 17
- Span of crimes: October 1997 – April 1998 (6 months and 5 days)
- Country: Italy
- Date apprehended: 6 May 1998

Donato Bilancia (10 July 1951 – 17 December 2020) was an Italian serial killer who murdered seventeen people – nine women and eight men – on the Italian Riviera in the period from October 1997 to April 1998. Bilancia's inconsistent modus operandi made him difficult to identify and capture. There were no obvious links between the majority of his murders. He chose most of his victims at random, across a vast area of Northern Italy, and became a synonym for fear among the people living along the Italian Riviera. He was given the nicknames Mostro della Liguria ("The Liguria Monster") and L'assassino dei treni ("Killer on the Trains").

Initially attributed with only nine homicides by the Italian police, Bilancia later confessed to having killed eight other people. With a sentence to 13 terms of life imprisonment, and no possibility of release, Bilancia has been defined by some newspapers as "the worst serial killer in the history of Italy". Despite confessing to the killings, Bilancia never explicitly regretted his crimes, claiming that he did not consciously commit them because he was "possessed" by a disease. Bilancia died in prison from COVID-19 on 17 December 2020.

== Biography ==
=== Background and early crimes ===
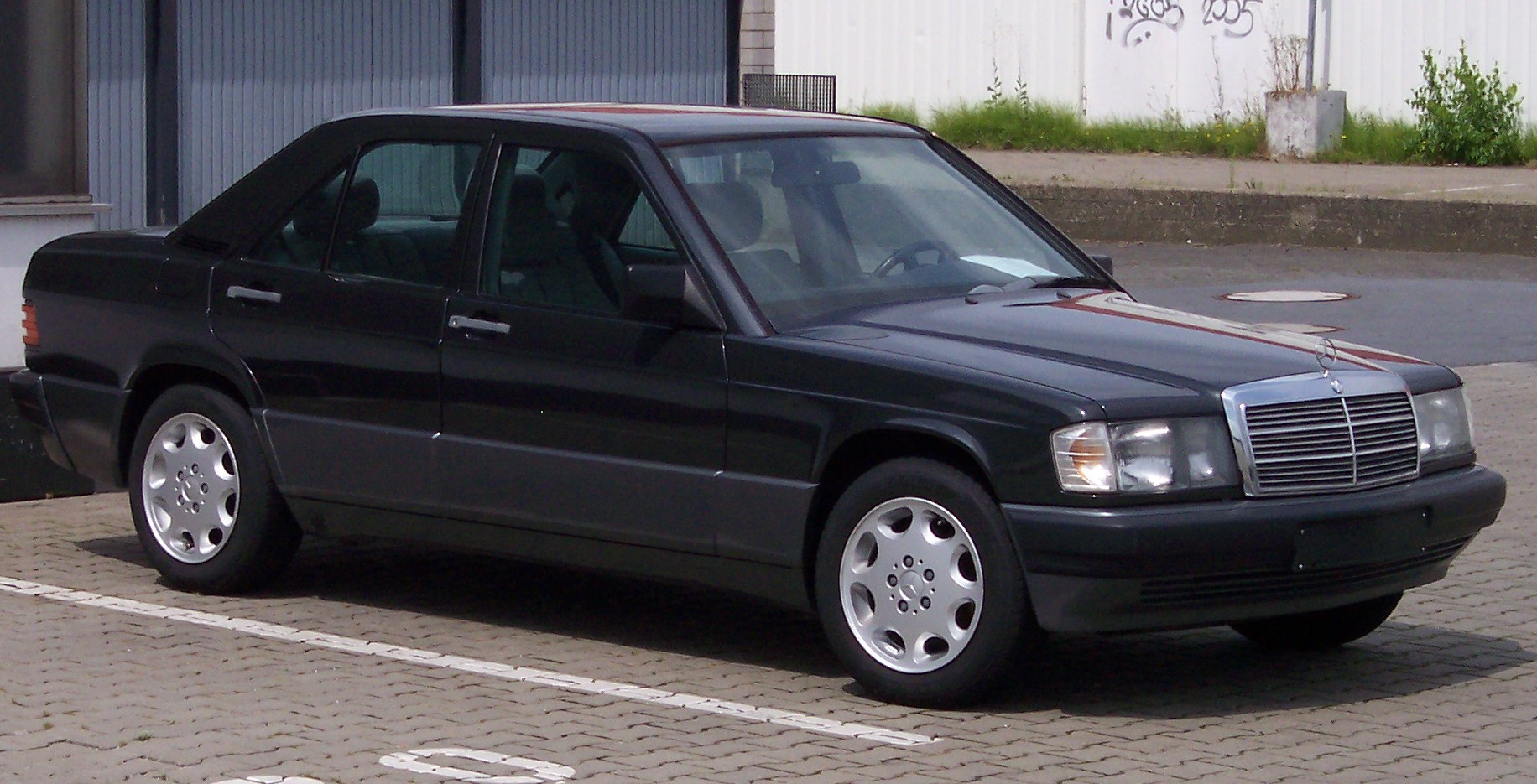
Mercedes-Benz W201-190, the same model used by Bilancia, was an important element in the reconstruction of the facts that led to his identification.

Bilancia was born in Potenza, Basilicata, in 1951. When he was about five years old, his family moved to northern Italy, first to Piedmont and then to Genoa in the Liguria region. He was a chronic bedwetter until age 10 or 12, and his mother shamed him by placing his wet mattress on the balcony where it could be seen by the neighbours. When undressing him for bed, his aunt would shame him by pulling down his underwear in front of his cousins to show his underdeveloped penis. At age 14, he decided to start calling himself Walter. He dropped out of high school and worked at jobs such as mechanic, bartender, baker, and delivery boy. While still underage, Bilancia was arrested and released for stealing a motor scooter and for stealing a truck loaded with Christmas sweets. In 1974, he was stopped and jailed for having an illegal gun. At some point, he was committed to the psychiatric division of the Genoa General Hospital, but escaped. After he was apprehended, he spent 18 months in prison for robbery. He served several prison terms in Italy and France for robbery and armed robbery. Despite his history of psychiatric problems, he had no record of violence up to age 47.

=== Murders ===
A map showing the subdivisions within the Liguria region. Most of Bilancia's murders took place in then existing province of Genoa (Genova), replaced by Metropolitan City of Genoa since 2015.

Bilancia was a compulsive gambler who lived alone. His first murder was the October 1997 strangulation of a friend who betrayed him by luring him into a rigged card game, in which he lost £185,000 (about $226,864.57). The authorities originally thought this death was a heart attack. Bilancia's next two murders were the revenge shooting of the game's operator, and of his wife. He emptied their safe afterwards. Bilancia later said these first killings gave him a taste for murder. In all his killings, he used or carried a .38 calibre revolver loaded with wadcutter ammunition. He made no attempt to conceal his victims' bodies. That same month, he followed a jeweller home to rob him, then shot him and his wife dead when the wife began screaming. He emptied their safe of jewellery. He next robbed and murdered a money changer. Two months later, he killed a security guard making his rounds simply because he did not like night watchmen. He killed an Albanian sex worker and a Russian worker. A second money changer was killed next, shot multiple times, and his safe emptied.

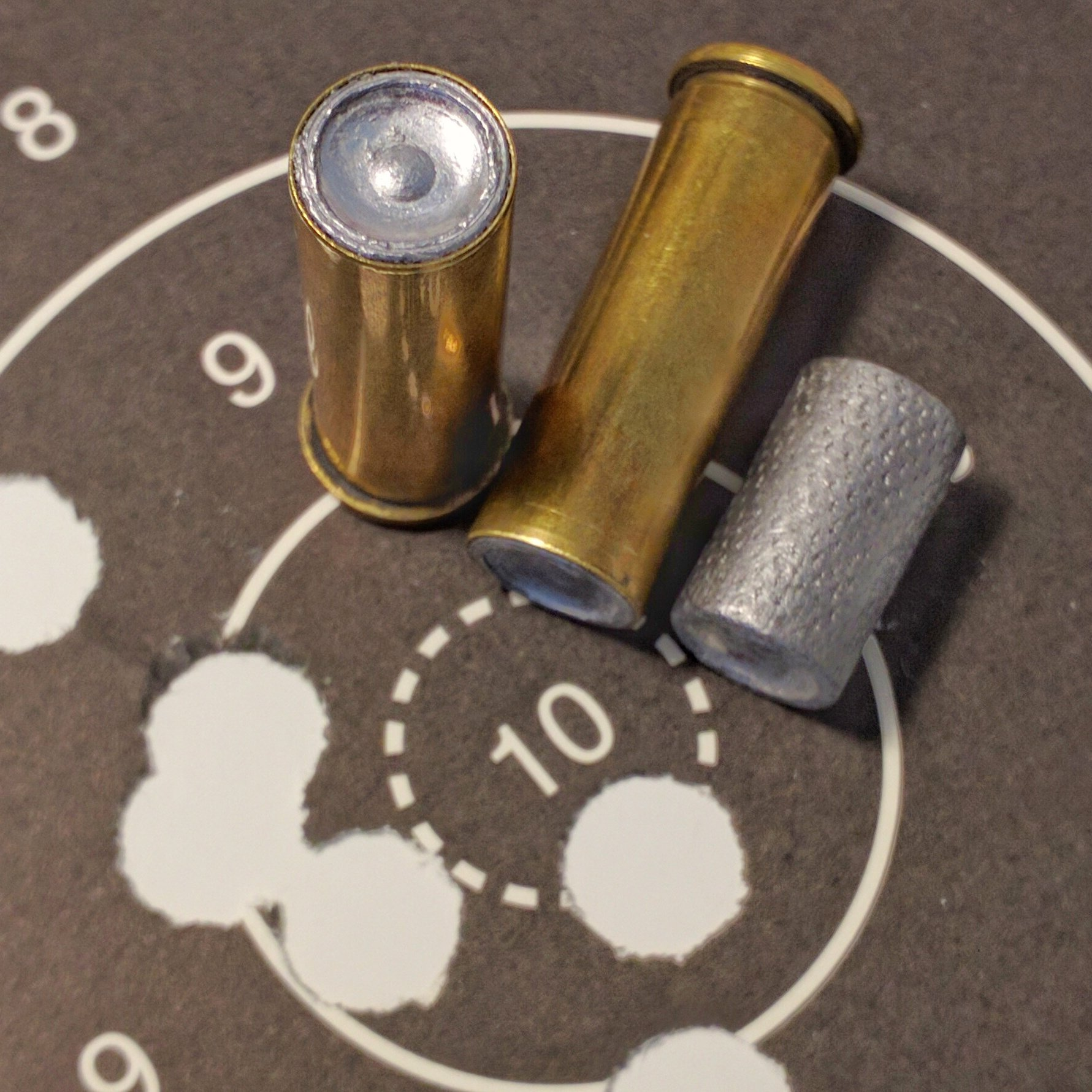
.38 Special wadcutter bullets very similar to those used by Bilancia.

In March 1998, while receiving oral sex at gunpoint from a sex worker, Bilancia shot and killed two night-watchmen who interrupted, then shot the sex worker, who survived to help develop a police sketch and later testify against him. He also killed a Nigerian sex worker and a Ukrainian sex worker, and robbed and assaulted an Italian sex worker without killing her. On 12 April 1998, he boarded the train from Genoa to Venice because he "wanted to kill a woman". Spotting a young woman travelling alone, he followed her to the toilet, unlocked the door with a skeleton key, shot her in the head and stole her train ticket. Six days later, he boarded the train to Sanremo and followed another young woman to the toilet. He used his key to enter, then used her jacket as a silencer and shot her behind the ear. Excited by her black underwear, he masturbated and used her clothes to clean up. The murders of two "respectable" women sparked a public outcry and the creation of a police task force.

On 20 April 1998, in his last killing before his arrest, Bilancia murdered Giuseppe Mileto, a service station attendant, after refuelling his car, then took the workday's receipts (2 million lira, or about $1,000) and fled the crime scene. In his statements to the investigators, Bilancia said he had killed Mileto after filling up the car. As he realized that he did not have enough money to pay for the refueling, Bilancia decided to rob him and ultimately killed him because another car had arrived and he got nervous when he saw Mileto exchange words with the driver.

=== Arrest and sentence ===
Based on the description of the black Mercedes one of his sex worker victims was seen entering the night she was killed, police considered Bilancia "suspect number one" and followed him for ten days. They collected his DNA from cigarette butts and a coffee cup, matching it to DNA found at crime scenes. On 6 May 1998, he was arrested at his home in Genoa and his revolver seized. After eight days in police custody, he confessed, speaking for two days and drawing 17 diagrams. On 12 April 2000, after an 11-month trial, Bilancia was sentenced to 13 terms of life imprisonment plus an additional 20 years imprisonment for the attempted murder of the sex worker who survived. The judge ordered that he never be released.

== Aftermath ==
Bilancia's criminal life and the events that saw him as a cruel serial killer had a major impact on the media of Italy. His story inspired a television miniseries, called Ultima pallottola ("The Last Bullet"), directed by Michele Soavi, broadcast for the first time in 2003 on Canale 5, with actors Giulio Scarpati (who plays the officer during the investigations) and Carlo Cecchi (as the serial killer). In 2004, Bilancia was interviewed live on Rai 1 during the broadcast on Domenica in conducted and hosted by Paolo Bonolis; Bonolis received bitter criticism for the interview. In the early 2010s, the then Five Star Movement leader Beppe Grillo admitted that he was neighbour of Bilancia as a child in Genoa. In 2015, Rai 3 dedicated an episode to Bilancia in the television show Stelle Nere ("Black Stars").

In prison, Bilancia was often recognized as a "model prisoner". In 2016, after 5 years of studies, he obtained a diploma in accounting disciplines with a score of 83/100, and he then began studying tourism disciplines at university. In 2017, Bilancia requested commutation of his life imprisonment penalty into 30 years of imprisonment, requesting summary judgment, which was abolished at the time of his trials but called into question by a sentence of the European Court of Human Rights. The Supreme Court of Cassation, the highest court of appeal in Italy, rejected his request. That same year, Bilancia obtained his first temporary permit to leave the prison under armed police escort in order to visit his parents' grave at Nizza Monferrato's cemetery in Piedmont.

In late 2019, Bilancia requested a second temporary permit. In September 2019, the request was denied by the criminal surveillance court of Padua as he was considered "still dangerous". According to his psychologist, he was "unable to adequately manage moments of frustration and anger out of prison". Furthermore, Bilancia had never undergone a psychological rehabilitation program and never explicitly repented his crimes, believing that he was "possessed" by a disease in the years in which he committed them.

== Death ==
Bilancia died on 17 December 2020, at the age of 69, after contracting COVID-19 in the Due Palazzi prison in Padua during the COVID-19 pandemic in Italy.

== See also ==
- Danilo Restivo
- List of serial killers by country
- List of serial killers by number of victims
