= Ferdinand Gamper =

Italian serial killer

- Born: 12 September 1957; Merano, South Tyrol, Italy
- Died: 1 March 1996 (aged 38); Riffian, South Tyrol, Italy
- Cause of death: Suicide by gunshot
- Other name: "The Monster of Merano"
- Conviction: Murder

Details
- Victims: 6
- Span of crimes: February – March 1996
- Country: Italy
- State: Bolzano
- Date apprehended: N/A

Ferdinand Gamper (12 September 1957 – 1 March 1996), known as The Monster of Merano, was a serial killer in South Tyrol, Italy. He killed six people in Merano during 1996, before he died.

== Biography ==
Born into a family devoted to pastoralism, Gamper's childhood and adolescence were characterized by poverty and work in the fields.

Many described him as a shy person, with a tendency to isolate himself, while others portrayed him as a mentally ill man. As a child, he was sexually abused by his father, and perhaps for this reason he was unable to have a normal approach towards women. Gamper spent many years working as a pastor in Switzerland, then returned home, finding employment in a hayloft in Riffian.

With a criminal record for contempt, resistance of a public official and public intoxication, he began to develop anti-Italian feelings from an early age, so much so that he joined Ein Tirol, a secessionist terrorist group, which claimed the annexation of South Tyrol to Austria. Moreover, Gamper did not even know the Italian language.

Two events marked the collapse of his already-disturbed psyche: the 1989 suicide of younger brother Richard, and then the death of his father.

== The murders ==
The first of the murders he committed took place on 8 February 1996, in Merano, where, with a gunshot to the back of the head, he killed 61-year-old Hans-Otto Detmering, an official for the Deutsche Bundesbank, and his Italian mistress, 50-year-old Clorinda Cecchetti: both were killed while walking along the Passer stream. At first, it was thought to be of an economic-patrimonial motive, linked to a private matter of the German banker. It was also suggested to be a crime of passion, for which Detmering's wife was a suspect, but the investigative hypothesis remained unanswered.

On 14 February, in the Merano area of Sinigo, a 58-year-old farmer, Umberto Marchioro, was shot in the head near his home. The weapon turned out to be the same one used in the murder of the two lovers; the method of execution was identical. In the face of such evidence, the investigative authority began to formulate the hypothesis that a serial killer could be the culprit. A few days later, a young drug-addicted blogger, Luca Nobile, was arrested on charges of being the perpetrator of the murders.

On 27 February, in the centre of Merano, 36-year-old accountant Paolo Vecchiolini was killed while walking with his girlfriend. The method and weapon used for the murder were the same as the previous ones. Despite the shocking attack, the girlfriend managed to provide the investigators with a facial composite, which described a tall, blonde man in overalls, carrying a rucksack. This new murder led the investigators to resume the murder trial, which exonerated Luca Nobile from any involvement.

On the morning of 1 March, another murder took place in Riffian. The victim was a neighbour of the South Tyrolean killer, 58-year-old bricklayer Tullio Melchiorri, who was shot in the forehead. After a series of testimonies and reports, the investigators managed to identify a potential suspect who lived in the area.

Near the body of Melchiorri were found two sheets containing sentences in German with racist and delusional content: "Italian pig, you settled in South Tyrol" and "I am an Italian emigrant, or Nazi, I am only responsible for infanticide. You have arrived late." (the latter was found by carabiniers near the crime scene). Gamper had fled and taken refuge in his farm. Marshal Guerrino Botte tried to approach the hiding Gamper, but was hit with a bullet to the face. After an intervention by Criminalpol and the state police, a firefight broke out. The seriously wounded sergeant was transported to a hospital in Bolzano, where he died shortly after.

== Suicide ==
During the siege, a shot was heard from inside the farm. At this point, the authorities broke in and found the lifeless body of Ferdinand Gamper, who had died by suicide with a gunshot to the head. The agents had no doubts that he was the Monster of Merano, who had terrified the population of the South Tyrolean city, especially those who spoke the Italian language. The weapon used by Gamper was a Weihrauch .22 calibre Magnum rifle with a sawed-off barrel and butt to make it concealable in a backpack which he carried with him, which later turned out to be the same weapon used in all six of the murders.

== Possible motive for the murders ==
After Gamper's suicide, the investigators continued to deepen their knowledge of the killer's personality. In the beginning, it was believed that the murders were committed solely because of schizophrenia, but this pathology had not been diagnosed by a doctor, so much so that the name Gamper was not included in any list of mentally ill patients in the Bolzano province.

Ethnic and racial hatred was then taken into consideration. Gamper, as noticed by the few people who knew him well, openly hated the Italians and seemed to be a pure misogynist. The victims of his murders were mainly males of Italian nationality, except for Detmering, who was a German citizen, but the killer was probably deceived by the fact that the banker was speaking Italian to his lover.

== Media emphasis ==
The story of the "Monster of Merano" received particular attention from the mass media, especially the German ones. The German press, in particular, had always insisted on ethnic hatred as a motive for the murders carried out by Gamper.

The story of Ferdinand Gamper highlighted the difficult situation which made the coexistence in South Tyrol between the German and the Italian linguistic groups a problem for many decades.

== See also ==
- List of serial killers by country

== Bibliography ==
- Arthur Oberhofer (2008). Die großen Kriminalfälle in Südtirol (in German). Vol. 3. Bolzano. ISBN 978-88-88396-10-1.
- Paolo Valente. The city on the border - Meran stories of men and ghosts. Milan: Oge 2006.
