= Saletto =

- Comune
- Comune di Saletto
- Location within Italy Location within Veneto
- Coordinates: 45°14′N 11°32′E
- Country: Italy
- Region: Veneto
- Province: Province of Padua (PD)

Area
  - Total: 10.8 km^{2} (4.2 sq mi)
- Elevation: 12 m (39 ft)

Population (Dec. 2004)
  - Total: 2,659
  - Density: 246/km^{2} (638/sq mi)
- Demonym: Salettari
- Time zone: UTC+1 (CET)
  - Summer (DST): UTC+2 (CEST)
- Postal code: 35046
- Dialing code: 0429

Saletto was a comune (municipality) in the Province of Padua in the Italian region Veneto, located about 70 kilometres (43 mi) southwest of Venice and about 35 kilometres (22 mi) southwest of Padua. As of 31 December 2004, it had a population of 2,659 and an area of 10.8 square kilometres (4.2 mi^{2}).

Saletto bordered the following former and current municipalities: Megliadino San Fidenzio (former), Montagnana, Noventa Vicentina, Ospedaletto Euganeo, Poiana Maggiore, Santa Margherita d'Adige (former).

Since 17 February 2018, Saletto has been part of the Borgo Veneto municipality.

== Demographic evolution ==
Historical population

Year	Pop.	±%
1861	?	—
1871	2,888	—
1881	3,217	+11.4%
1901	3,279	+1.9%
1911	3,864	+17.8%

Year	Pop.	±%
1921	4,232	+9.5%
1931	4,034	−4.7%
1936	3,880	−3.8%
1951	3,813	−1.7%
1961	2,869	−24.8%

Year	Pop.	±%
1971	2,505	−12.7%
1981	2,466	−1.6%
1991	2,422	−1.8%
2001	2,577	+6.4%

Source: Data from ISTAT
