= Casale di Scodosia =

- Comune
- Comune di Casale di Scodosia
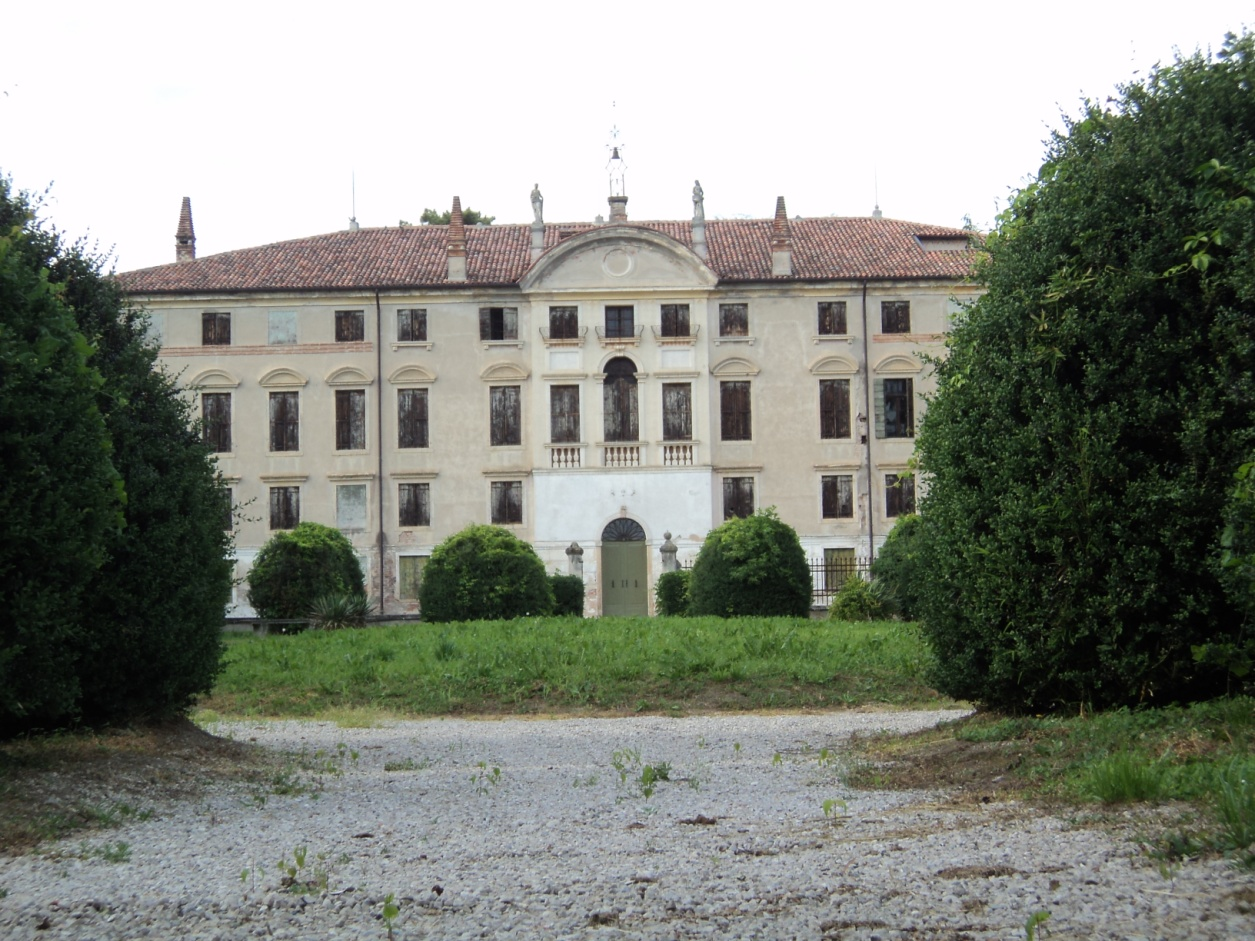
- Villa Correr.

- Location within Italy Location within Veneto
- Coordinates: 45°11′N 11°28′E
- Country: Italy
- Region: Veneto
- Province: Padua (PD)
- Frazioni: Altaura, Carubbio

Government
  - Mayor: Marcello Marchioro

Area
  - Total: 21.2 km^{2} (8.2 sq mi)
- Elevation: 13 m (43 ft)

Population (31 May 2017)
  - Total: 4,847
  - Density: 229/km^{2} (592/sq mi)
- Demonym: Casalesi
- Time zone: UTC+1 (CET)
  - Summer (DST): UTC+2 (CEST)
- Postal code: 35040
- Dialing code: 0429

Casale di Scodosia is a comune (municipality) in the Province of Padua in the Italian region Veneto, located about 70 kilometres (43 mi) southwest of Venice and about 40 kilometres (25 mi) southwest of Padua.

Casale di Scodosia borders the following municipalities: Megliadino San Fidenzio, Megliadino San Vitale, Merlara, Montagnana, Piacenza d'Adige, Urbana.

Sunday May 31, 2009, Casale di Scodosia broke the Guinness World Record for "The largest panini", the sandwich was over 2,000 metres (6,600 ft) long.
