= Merlara =

- Comune
- Comune di Merlara
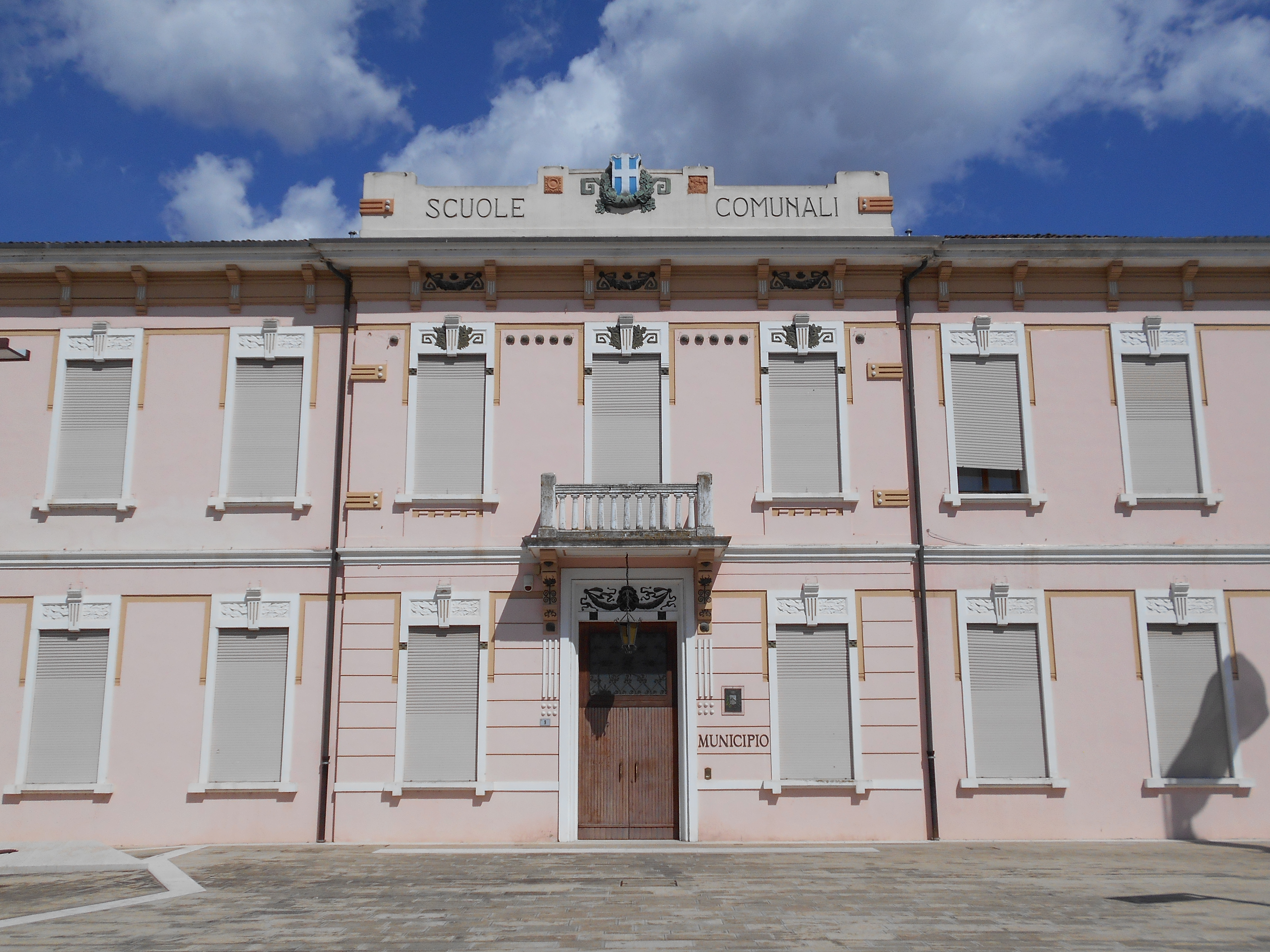
- city hall

- Location within Italy Location within Veneto
- Coordinates: 45°10′N 11°26′E
- Country: Italy
- Region: Veneto
- Province: Province of Padua (PD)

Area
  - Total: 21.4 km^{2} (8.3 sq mi)
- Elevation: 13 m (43 ft)

Population (Dec. 2004)
  - Total: 2,980
  - Density: 139/km^{2} (361/sq mi)
- Time zone: UTC+1 (CET)
  - Summer (DST): UTC+2 (CEST)
- Postal code: 35040
- Dialing code: 0429

Merlara is a comune (municipality) in the Province of Padua in the Italian region of Veneto, located about 80 kilometres (50 mi) southwest of Venice and about 45 kilometres (28 mi) southwest of Padua. As of 31 December 2004, it had a population of 2,980 and an area of 21.4 square kilometres (8.3 mi^{2}).

Merlara borders the following municipalities: Casale di Scodosia, Castelbaldo, Masi, Piacenza d'Adige, Terrazzo, and Urbana.

== Demographic evolution ==
Historical population

Year	Pop.	±%
1861	?	—
1871	2,705	—
1881	3,023	+11.8%
1901	3,073	+1.7%
1911	3,801	+23.7%

Year	Pop.	±%
1921	4,228	+11.2%
1931	4,405	+4.2%
1936	4,513	+2.5%
1951	4,418	−2.1%
1961	3,512	−20.5%

Year	Pop.	±%
1971	3,093	−11.9%
1981	3,128	+1.1%
1991	3,048	−2.6%
2001	2,960	−2.9%

Source: Data from ISTAT

== Merlara DOC ==
Italian wine, both red, white and frizzante, under the Merlara DOC appellation have been produced in this region since 2000. Grapes destined for DOC production must be harvested up to a maximum yield of 12 tonnes/hectare with the finished wines fermented to a minimum alcohol level of 11%.

Red Merlara wines are a blend of primarily 50-70% Merlot with up to 50% of other local, non-aromatic red grape varieties permitted to fill in the remainder of the blend. White Merlara is made from 50 to 70% Friulano with up to 50% of other local white grape varieties permitted to fill in the remainder. Other wines produced in the region include a slightly sparkling frizzante made from Marzemino and varietal wines made from Merlot, Friulano and other varieties provided that constitute at least 85% of the designated variety.
