= Megliadino San Fidenzio =

Former comune in Padua Province, Veneto, Italy

- Comune
- Comune di Megliadino San Fidenzio
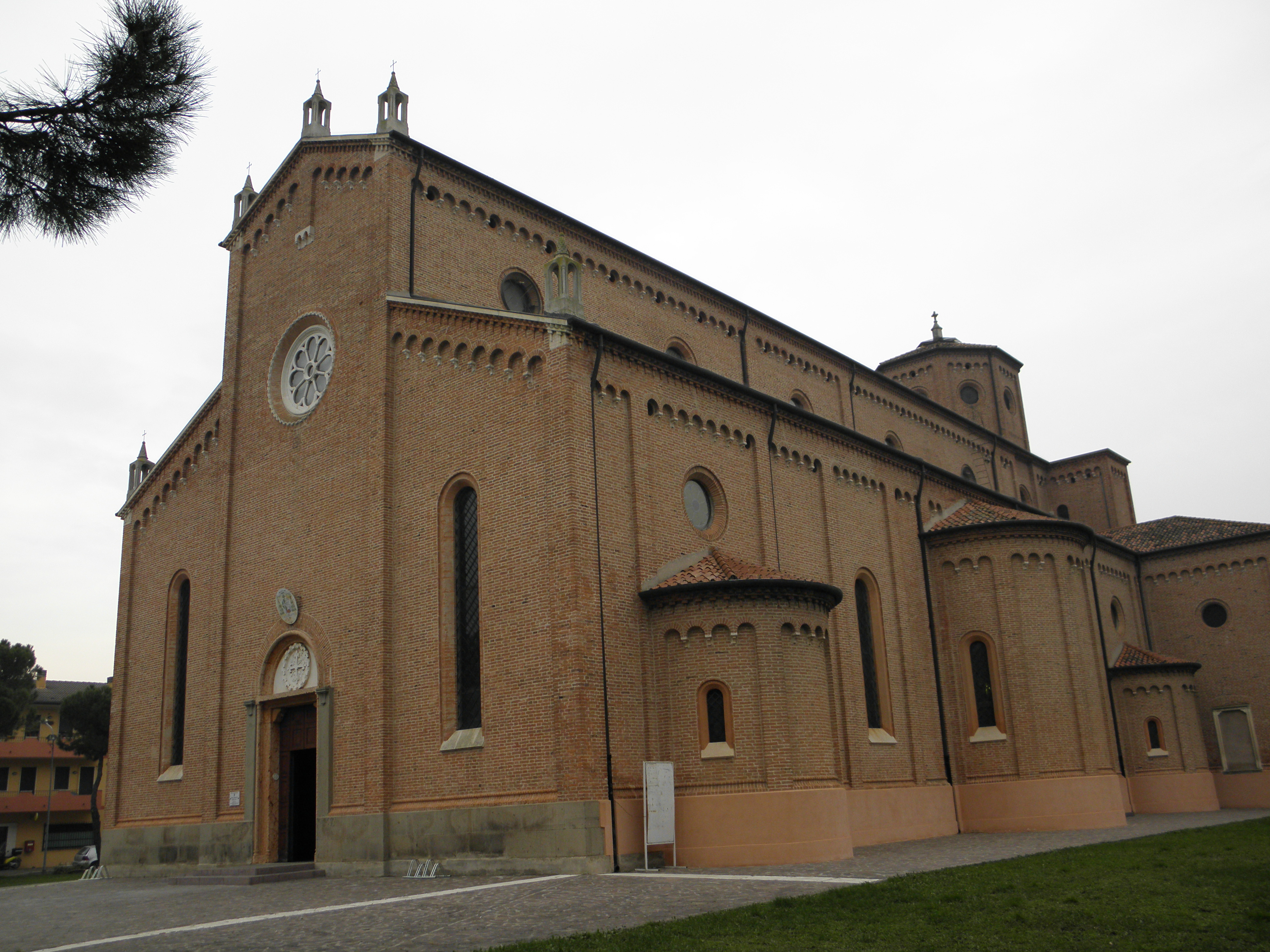
- Church of San Fidenzio.

- Location within Italy Location within Veneto
- Coordinates: 45°13′N 11°31′E
- Country: Italy
- Region: Veneto
- Province: Padua (PD)

Government
  - Mayor: Daniela Bordin

Area
  - Total: 15.6 km^{2} (6.0 sq mi)
- Elevation: 12 m (39 ft)

Population (31 December 2016)
  - Total: 1,934
  - Density: 124/km^{2} (321/sq mi)
- Demonym: Fidentini
- Time zone: UTC+1 (CET)
  - Summer (DST): UTC+2 (CEST)
- Postal code: 35040
- Dialing code: 0429
- Website: Official website

Megliadino San Fidenzio was a comune (municipality) in the Province of Padua in the Italian region of Veneto, located about 70 kilometres (43 mi) southwest of Venice and about 35 kilometres (22 mi) southwest of Padua.

Megliadino San Fidenzio bordered the following former and current municipalities: Casale di Scodosia, Megliadino San Vitale, Montagnana, Saletto (former), Santa Margherita d'Adige (former).

It is named for the legendary bishop Saint Fidentius of Padua.

Since 17 February 2018 Megliadino San Fidenzio is part of Borgo Veneto municipality.
