= Carceri, Veneto =

Carceri
- Comune
- Comune di Carceri
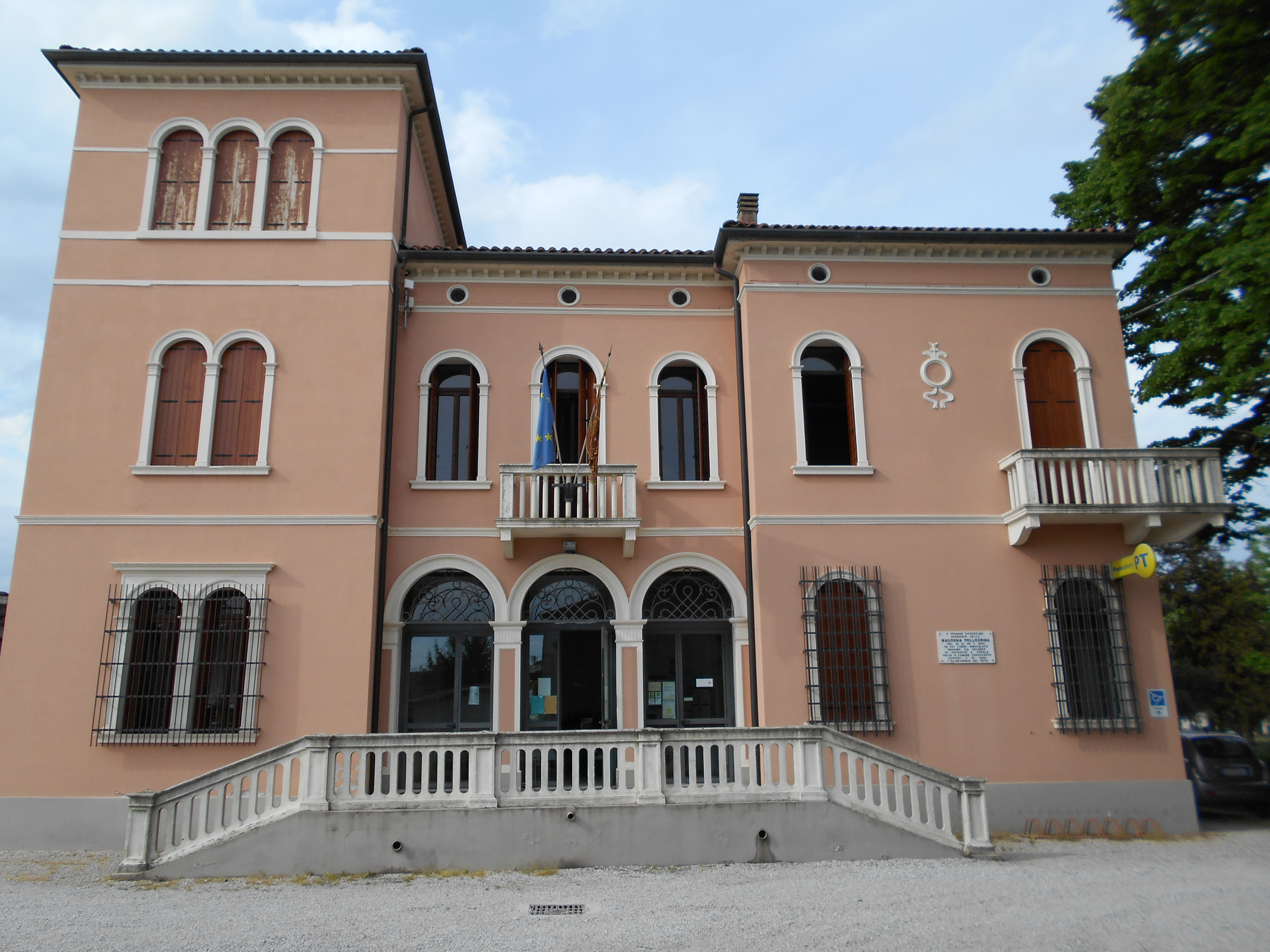
- town hall

- Location within Italy Location within Veneto
- Coordinates: 45°12′N 11°37′E
- Country: Italy
- Region: Veneto
- Province: Province of Padua (PD)

Area
  - Total: 9.7 km^{2} (3.7 sq mi)

Population (Dec. 2004)
  - Total: 1,579
  - Density: 160/km^{2} (420/sq mi)
- Time zone: UTC+1 (CET)
  - Summer (DST): UTC+2 (CEST)
- Postal code: 35040
- Dialing code: 0429

Carceri is a comune (municipality) in the Province of Padua in the Italian region Veneto, located about 60 kilometres (37 mi) southwest of Venice and about 30 kilometres (19 mi) southwest of Padua. As of 31 December 2004, it had a population of 1,579 and an area of 9.7 square kilometres (3.7 mi^{2}). Its name means "prison" in Italian.

Carceri borders the following municipalities: Este, Ospedaletto Euganeo, Ponso, Vighizzolo d'Este.

== Demographic evolution ==
Historical population

Year	Pop.	±%
1861	?	—
1871	1,820	—
1881	1,984	+9.0%
1901	2,074	+4.5%
1911	2,259	+8.9%

Year	Pop.	±%
1921	2,403	+6.4%
1931	2,543	+5.8%
1936	2,699	+6.1%
1951	2,675	−0.9%
1961	1,995	−25.4%

Year	Pop.	±%
1971	1,699	−14.8%
1981	1,623	−4.5%
1991	1,528	−5.9%
2001	1,524	−0.3%

Source: Data from ISTAT
