= Barbona =

- Comune
- Comune di Barbona
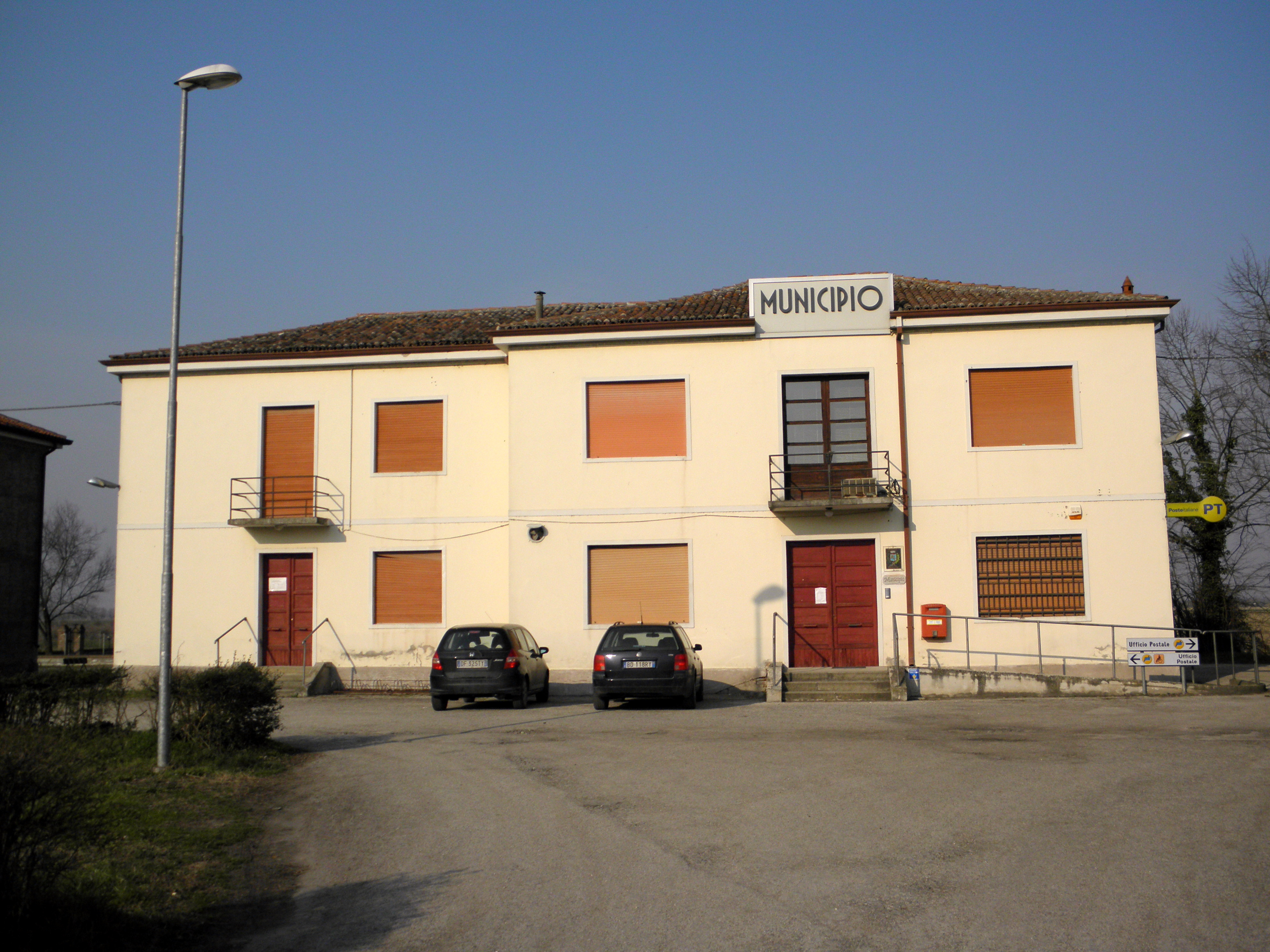

- Location within Italy Location within Veneto
- Coordinates: 45°6′N 11°42′E
- Country: Italy
- Region: Veneto
- Province: Province of Padua (PD)
- Frazioni: Lusia

Area
  - Total: 8.6 km^{2} (3.3 sq mi)

Population (Dec. 2004)
  - Total: 765
  - Density: 89/km^{2} (230/sq mi)
- Demonym: Barbonesi
- Time zone: UTC+1 (CET)
  - Summer (DST): UTC+2 (CEST)
- Postal code: 35040
- Dialing code: 0425

Barbona is a comune (municipality) in the Province of Padua in the Italian region Veneto, located about 60 kilometres (37 mi) southwest of Venice and about 40 kilometres (25 mi) southwest of Padua. As of 31 December 2004, it had a population of 765 and an area of 8.6 square kilometres (3.3 mi^{2}).

The municipality of Barbona contains the frazione (subdivision) Lusia.

Barbona borders the following municipalities: Lusia, Rovigo, Sant'Urbano, Vescovana.

== Demographic evolution ==
Historical population

Year	Pop.	±%
1861	?	—
1871	1,528	—
1881	1,490	−2.5%
1901	1,442	−3.2%
1911	1,555	+7.8%

Year	Pop.	±%
1921	1,704	+9.6%
1931	1,726	+1.3%
1936	1,759	+1.9%
1951	1,712	−2.7%
1961	1,205	−29.6%

Year	Pop.	±%
1971	1,055	−12.4%
1981	892	−15.5%
1991	800	−10.3%
2001	780	−2.5%

Source: Data from ISTAT
