= Ospedaletto Euganeo =

- Comune
- Comune di Ospedaletto Euganeo
- Location within Italy Location within Veneto
- Coordinates: 45°14′N 11°37′E
- Country: Italy
- Region: Veneto
- Province: Province of Padua (PD)
- Frazioni: Tresto, Palugana, Santa Croce, Dossi

Area
  - Total: 21.4 km^{2} (8.3 sq mi)
- Elevation: 12 m (39 ft)

Population (Dec. 2004)
  - Total: 5,667
  - Density: 265/km^{2} (686/sq mi)
- Time zone: UTC+1 (CET)
  - Summer (DST): UTC+2 (CEST)
- Postal code: 35045
- Dialing code: 0429

Ospedaletto Euganeo is a comune (municipality) in the province of Padua in the Italian region of Veneto, located about 60 kilometres (37 mi) southwest of Venice and about 30 kilometres (19 mi) southwest of Padua. As of 31 December 2004, it had a population of 5,667 and an area of 21.4 square kilometres (8.3 mi^{2}).

The municipality of Ospedaletto Euganeo contains the frazioni (subdivisions, mainly villages and hamlets) Tresto, Palugana, Peagnola, Santa Croce, and Dossi.

Ospedaletto Euganeo borders the following municipalities: Carceri, Este, Lozzo Atestino, Noventa Vicentina, Ponso, Saletto, Santa Margherita d'Adige.

== Demographic evolution ==
Historical population

| Year | Pop. | ±% |
|---|---|---|
| 1861 | ? | — |
| 1871 | 3,486 | — |
| 1881 | 3,655 | +4.8% |
| 1901 | 3,862 | +5.7% |
| 1911 | 4,571 | +18.4% |

| Year | Pop. | ±% |
|---|---|---|
| 1921 | 4,989 | +9.1% |
| 1931 | 5,312 | +6.5% |
| 1936 | 5,511 | +3.7% |
| 1951 | 5,326 | −3.4% |
| 1961 | 4,355 | −18.2% |

| Year | Pop. | ±% |
|---|---|---|
| 1971 | 4,609 | +5.8% |
| 1981 | 5,065 | +9.9% |
| 1991 | 5,052 | −0.3% |
| 2001 | 5,401 | +6.9% |

Source: Data from ISTAT

== Twin towns ==
- Bucha, Ukraine
