= Piacenza d'Adige =

- Comune
- Comune di Piacenza d'Adige
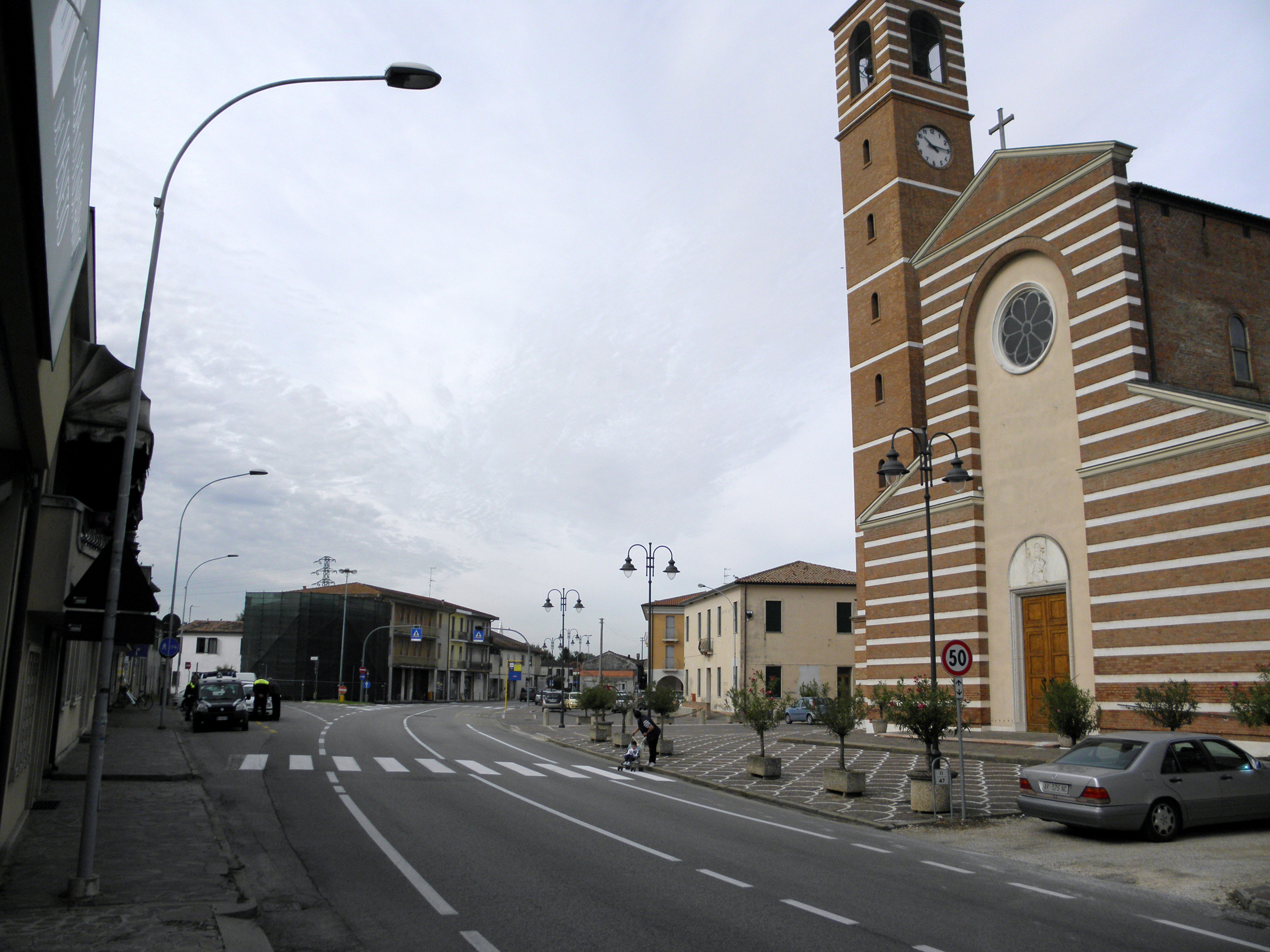
- Parish church.

- Location within Italy Location within Veneto
- Coordinates: 45°8′N 11°33′E
- Country: Italy
- Region: Veneto
- Province: Padua (PD)

Government
  - Mayor: Primo Magri

Area
  - Total: 18.49 km^{2} (7.14 sq mi)
- Elevation: 10 m (33 ft)

Population (31 August 2021)
  - Total: 1,226
  - Density: 66.31/km^{2} (171.7/sq mi)
- Time zone: UTC+1 (CET)
  - Summer (DST): UTC+2 (CEST)
- Postal code: 35040
- Dialing code: 0425
- Website: Official website

Piacenza d'Adige is a comune (municipality) in the Province of Padua in the Italian region Veneto, located about 70 kilometres (43 mi) southwest of Venice and about 40 kilometres (25 mi) southwest of Padua.

Piacenza d'Adige borders the following municipalities: Badia Polesine, Casale di Scodosia, Lendinara, Masi, Megliadino San Vitale, Merlara, Ponso, Sant'Urbano, Santa Margherita d'Adige, Vighizzolo d'Este.
