= Ponso =

- Comune
- Comune di Ponso
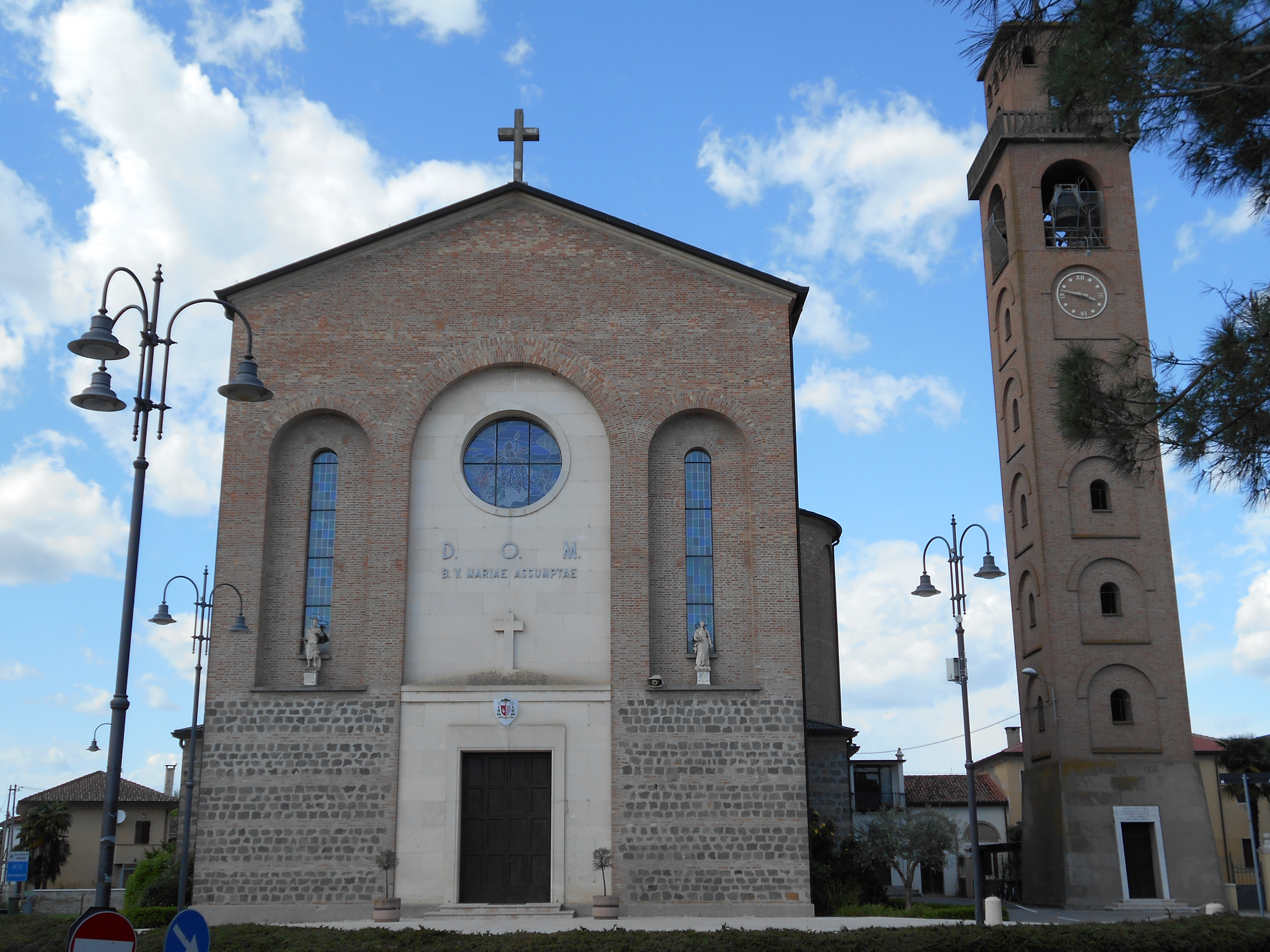
- church

- Location within Italy Location within Veneto
- Coordinates: 45°12′N 11°35′E
- Country: Italy
- Region: Veneto
- Province: Province of Padua (PD)
- Frazioni: Bresega, Chiesazza

Area
  - Total: 10.9 km^{2} (4.2 sq mi)

Population (Dec. 2004)
  - Total: 2,435
  - Density: 223/km^{2} (579/sq mi)
- Time zone: UTC+1 (CET)
  - Summer (DST): UTC+2 (CEST)
- Postal code: 35040
- Dialing code: 0429
- Website: Official website

Ponso is a comune (municipality) in the Province of Padua in the Italian region Veneto, located about 60 kilometres (37 mi) southwest of Venice and about 35 kilometres (22 mi) southwest of Padua. As of 31 December 2004, it had a population of 2,435 and an area of 10.9 square kilometres (4.2 mi^{2}).

The municipality of Ponso contains the frazioni (subdivisions, mainly villages and hamlets) Bresega and Chiesazza.

Ponso borders the following municipalities: Carceri, Ospedaletto Euganeo, Piacenza d'Adige, Santa Margherita d'Adige, Vighizzolo d'Este.

Among its buildings is the 17th-century Villa Francanzani.

== Demographic evolution ==
Historical population

Year	Pop.	±%
1861	?	—
1871	1,798	—
1881	2,056	+14.3%
1901	2,109	+2.6%
1911	2,403	+13.9%

Year	Pop.	±%
1921	2,751	+14.5%
1931	2,992	+8.8%
1936	3,109	+3.9%
1951	3,178	+2.2%
1961	2,477	−22.1%

Year	Pop.	±%
1971	2,262	−8.7%
1981	2,317	+2.4%
1991	2,291	−1.1%
2001	2,365	+3.2%

Source: Data from ISTAT
