= Granze =

- Comune
- Comune di Granze
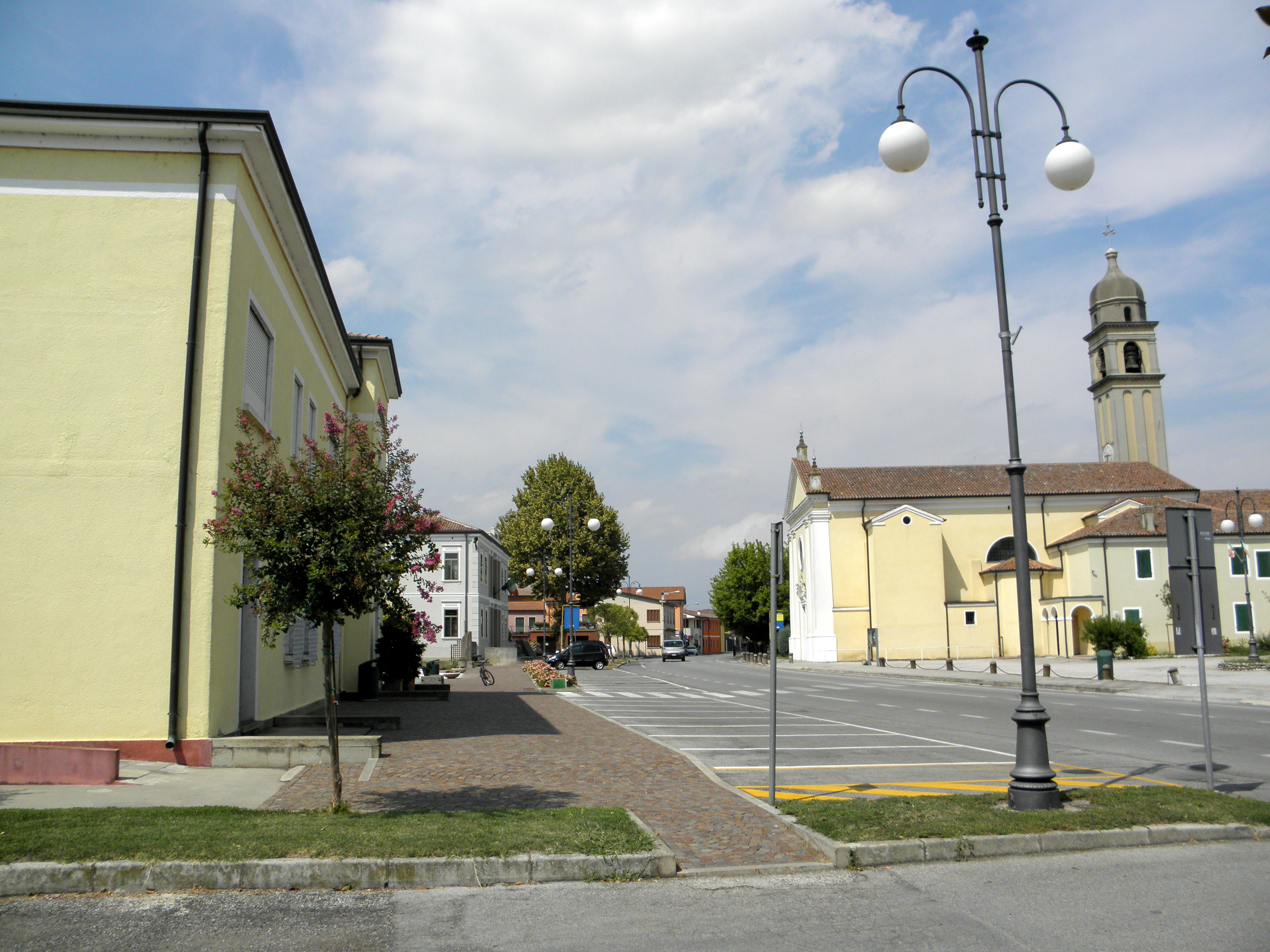

- Location within Italy Location within Veneto
- Coordinates: 45°11′N 11°43′E
- Country: Italy
- Region: Veneto
- Province: Province of Padua (PD)

Area
  - Total: 11.4 km^{2} (4.4 sq mi)

Population (Dec. 2004)
  - Total: 1,803
  - Density: 158/km^{2} (410/sq mi)
- Demonym: Granzesi
- Time zone: UTC+1 (CET)
  - Summer (DST): UTC+2 (CEST)
- Postal code: 35040
- Dialing code: 0429
- ISTAT code: 028043

Granze is a comune (municipality) in the Province of Padua in the Italian region Veneto, located about 50 kilometres (31 mi) southwest of Venice and about 30 kilometres (19 mi) southwest of Padua. As of 31 December 2004, it had a population of 1,803 and an area of 11.4 square kilometres (4.4 mi^{2}).

Granze borders the following municipalities: Sant'Elena, Sant'Urbano, Solesino, Stanghella, Vescovana, Villa Estense.

== Demographic evolution ==
Historical population

Year	Pop.	±%
1861	?	—
1871	1,784	—
1881	1,791	+0.4%
1901	1,664	−7.1%
1911	1,902	+14.3%

Year	Pop.	±%
1921	2,172	+14.2%
1931	2,314	+6.5%
1936	2,331	+0.7%
1951	2,186	−6.2%
1961	1,746	−20.1%

Year	Pop.	±%
1971	1,495	−14.4%
1981	1,424	−4.7%
1991	1,517	+6.5%
2001	1,671	+10.2%

Source: Data from ISTAT
