= Vighizzolo d'Este =

- Comune
- Comune di Vighizzolo d'Este
- Location within Italy Location within Veneto
- Coordinates: 45°11′N 11°38′E
- Country: Italy
- Region: Veneto
- Province: Padua (PD)

Government
  - Mayor: Michele Barbetta

Area
  - Total: 17.2 km^{2} (6.6 sq mi)
- Elevation: 11 m (36 ft)

Population (31 December 2010)
  - Total: 955
  - Density: 55.5/km^{2} (144/sq mi)
- Demonym: Vighizzolesi
- Time zone: UTC+1 (CET)
  - Summer (DST): UTC+2 (CEST)
- Postal code: 35040
- Dialing code: 0429

Vighizzolo d'Este is a comune (municipality) in the Province of Padua in the Italian region Veneto, located about 60 kilometres (37 mi) southwest of Venice and about 30 kilometres (19 mi) southwest of Padua.

Vighizzolo d'Este borders the following municipalities: Carceri, Este, Piacenza d'Adige, Ponso, Sant'Urbano, Villa Estense.

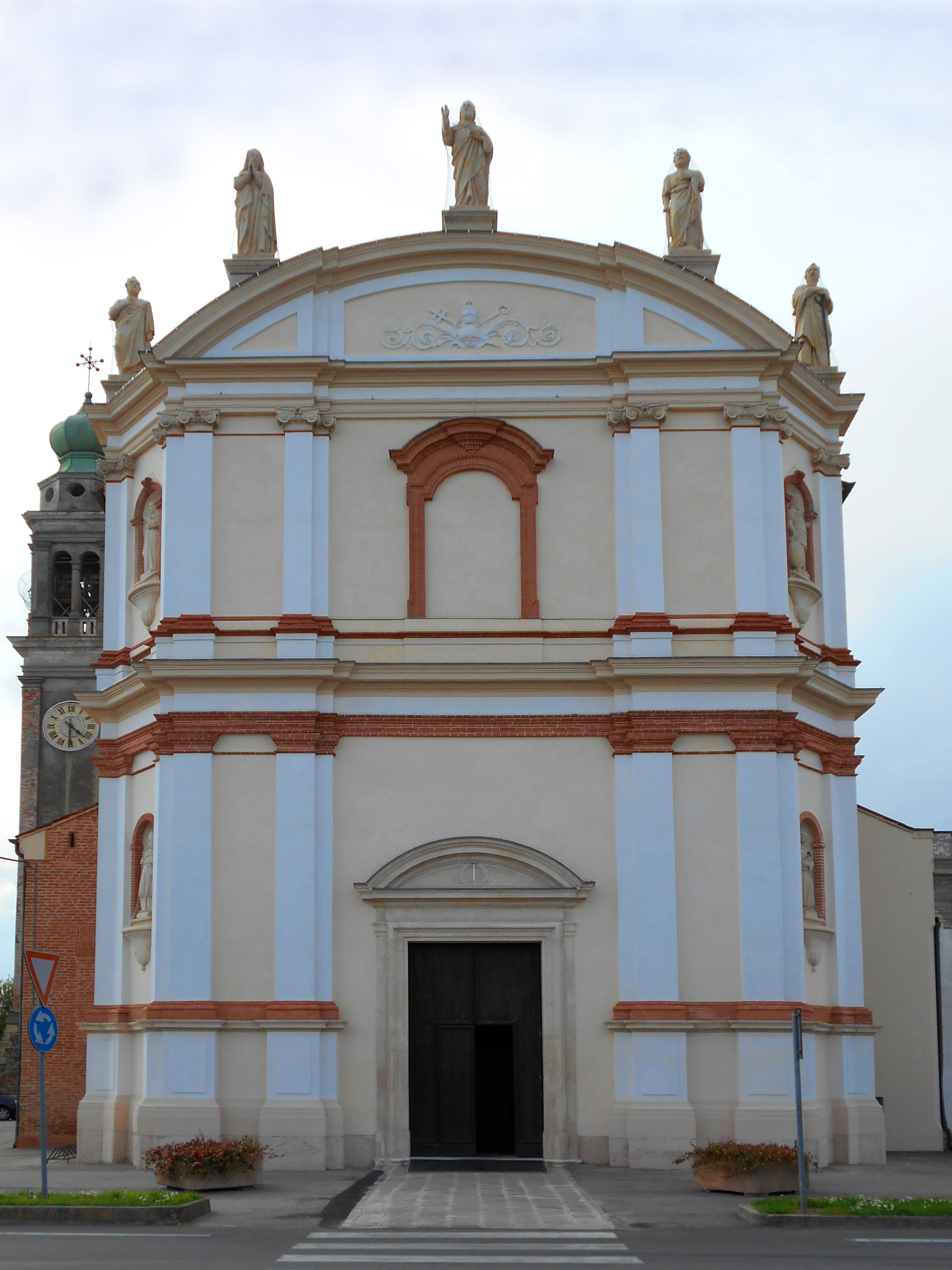
Church
