= Bevilacqua =

- Comune
- Comune di Bevilacqua
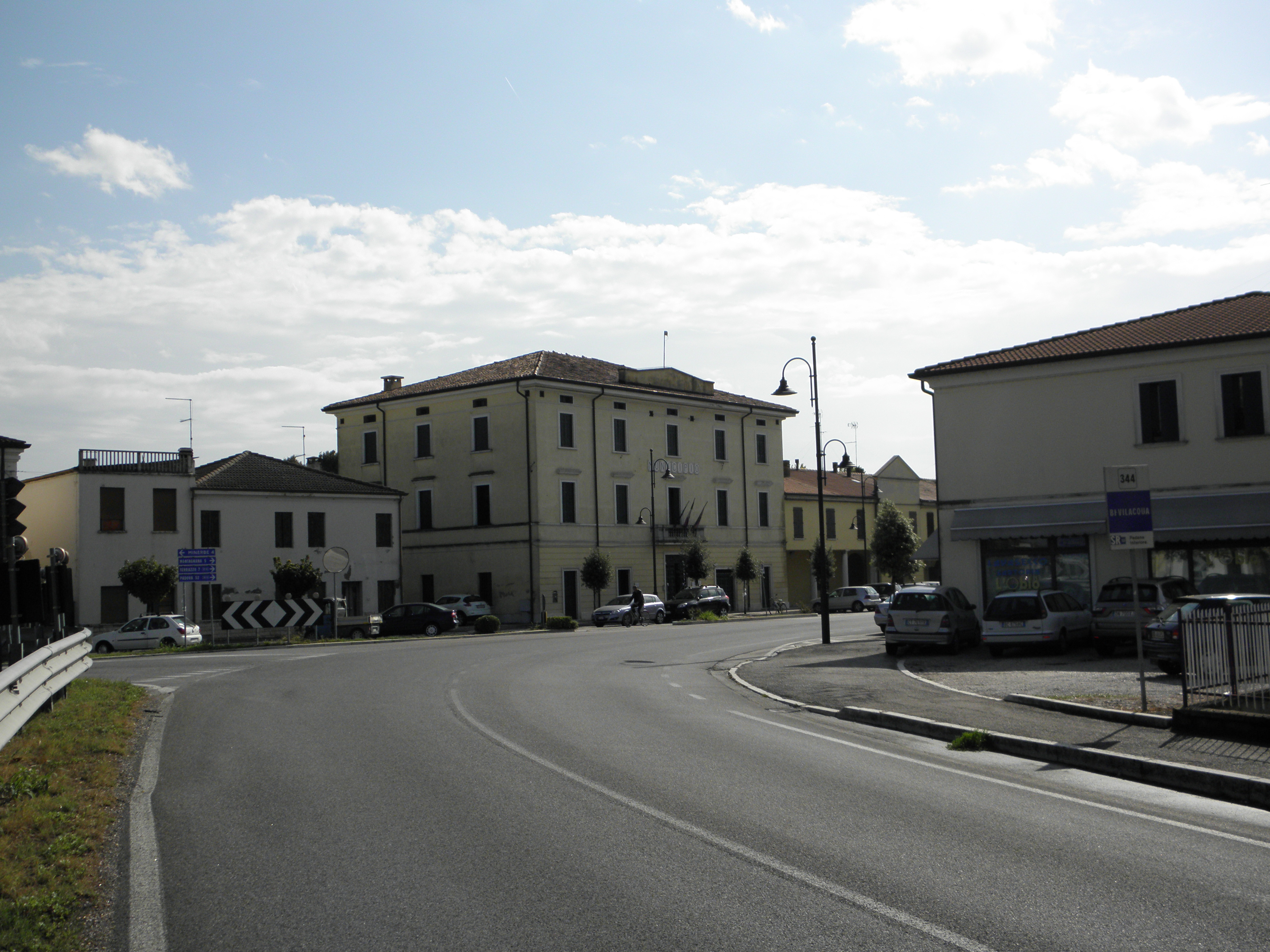

- Location within Italy Location within Veneto
- Coordinates: 45°14′00″N 11°23′45″E
- Country: Italy
- Region: Veneto
- Province: Verona (VR)

Government
  - Mayor: Fosca Falamischia

Area
  - Total: 12.12 km^{2} (4.68 sq mi)
- Elevation: 14 m (46 ft)

Population (2018-01-01)
  - Total: 1,691
  - Density: 139.5/km^{2} (361.4/sq mi)
- Demonym: Bevilacquesi
- Time zone: UTC+1 (CET)
  - Summer (DST): UTC+2 (CEST)
- Postal code: 37040
- Dialing code: 0442
- Patron saint: St. Anthony Abbot
- Saint day: 17 January
- Website: Official website

Bevilacqua (Italian pronunciation: [beviˈlakkwa]) is a comune (municipality) with 1,927 inhabitants in the province of Verona, Veneto, Italy.

== History ==
The Comune di Bevilacqua began as a settlement of ancient Venetic people on the banks of the Adige River, documented to 589 AD. The fortification of this settlement eventually came to be known as the Bevilacqua Castle, located in the Principality of Bevilacqua established on 7 May 1059.

In the 14th century, Count Guglielmo Bevilacqua began a restoration and expansion of the castle, completed by his son Francesco. In 1532, Count Gianfrancesco Bevilacqua commissioned Michele Sanmicheli to completely renovate the medieval building and convert it into a villa with a new and more comfortable interior. In 1756, Count Gaetano Ippolito Bevilacqua renovated part of the castle. After damage caused during the Napoleonic Wars at the beginning of the 19th century, the castle was set on fire by Austrian troops in 1848. After 1860, Baroness Felicita La Masa Bevilacqua had the castle renovated in successive stages. The external walls were decorated with merlons and the entire building acquired a neo-Gothic savour in line with the romantic spirit of that time.

In 1932, the family donated the castle to the Italian state and commissioned Engineer Eleuterio Mutto's design for converting the castle into a nursing home ("Asilo di Quiete Bevilacqua-La Masa"). In 1945 the castle was entrusted to the Salesian Society, who used it as a boarding school until 1966. In 1980, the castle underwent a total restoration program aimed at the architectural recovery of the magnificence of the 16th century.

== Main sights ==
The Bevilacqua Castle is between Padua and Verona and 5 kilometres (3 mi) from Montagnana; it has been meticulously maintained and restored and is open to visitors. The external medieval architecture encloses a 16th-century interior ascribed to the famous architect Michele Sanmicheli. The first floor offers room to accommodate up to 500 guests and is surrounded on three sides by a hanging garden. The internal court, with its porticos, offers additional room for buffets or special evenings. The Bevilacqua Castle also hosts a standing exhibition of antique furniture.

== See also ==
- Bevilacqua dynasty
