= Villa Francanzani, Ponso =

Palace in Veneto, Italy

Villa Francanzani is a 17th-century rural palace located in Ponso, region of Veneto, Italy.

The villa has a Palladian layout with a central round arched window in the facade, and a roofline with decorative urns and balustrades. The central hall was frescoed by Filippo Maccari. There is a small chapel associated with the palace.
