= Bevilacqua dynasty =

The Bevilacqua dynasty governed parts of Northern Italy between the 10th and 12th centuries. Their rise to prominence began in 962 when Otto I the Great, the first Holy Roman Emperor, appointed Antonio Bevilacqua as Governor of Lazise. The family remained loyal to the Emperors until they later allied themselves with Matilda of Tuscany; they were granted a Principality at Bevilacqua in 1059, and acquired other territories in the areas of Verona and Ferrara. During the 12th-century conflicts between the Guelphs and Ghibellines, the Bevilacqua led the victorious Ghibellines of Verona. They later supported the Canossa family of the Lombard League against Frederick Barbarossa, and in recognition received the church of San Salvaro in Verona.

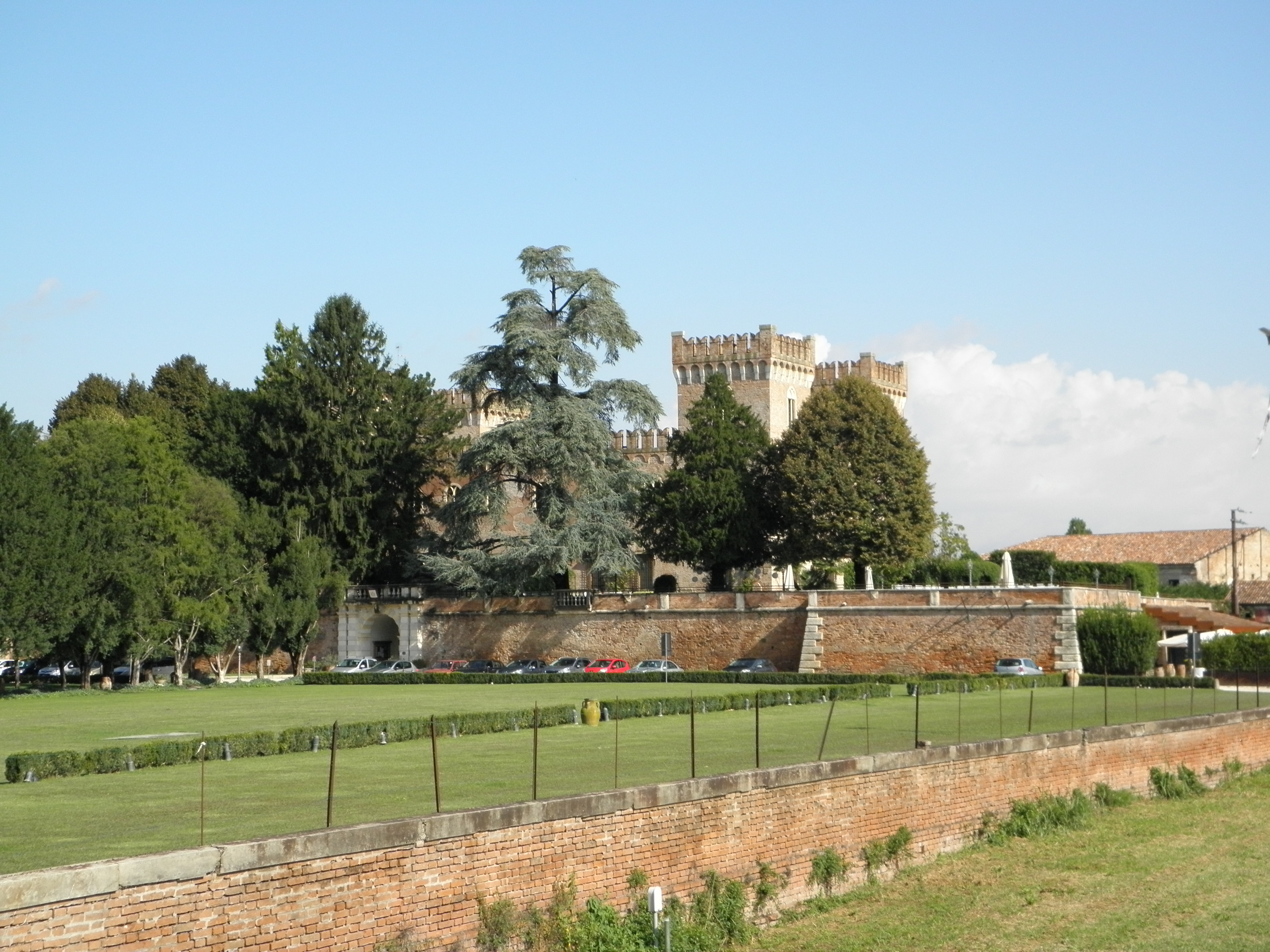
Castle of Bevilacqua

== 10th century ==
=== Rise of King Otto ===
The Bevilacqua family is originally from Ala in the province of Trento, and the family's first coat of arms was a white eagle's wing on a light blue background with a prince's crown. The first written account of the Bevilacqua dynasty coincides with the rise to power of King Otto I the Great (912-973) of Germany. Otto I was the son of King Henry I (876-936) of Germany, the founder of the Saxon dynasty. In 962, Otto I became King of the Lombards and controlled much of northern Italy. The king gained control of northern Italy by defeating the French, Spanish, Hungarians, and Italians. On 2 February 962, Pope John XII crowned him the first Holy Roman Emperor which marked the establishment of the Holy Roman Empire and the German nation.

The Bevilacqua family had ruled over Lake Garda from the city of Lazise since the 9th century. In order to ensure Prince Antonio Bevilacqua's support, Holy Roman Emperor Otto I issued his Concessagli Decree which granted autonomy to the country of Lazise making it the first free Common of the Italians. In 962, Antonio Bevilacqua was made Governor of Lazise, and he reconstructed and expanded his family's immense castle which is now surrounded by the magnificent Villa Bernini Park in Lazise. Lazise was made a city-state in 983 under the rule of Emperor Otto I. The Bevilacqua family was granted considerable military and commercial autonomy, a right that was expanded by later emperors.

=== In the city of Aquila ===
The next written account about the Bevilacqua family is a document from 987 which is stored in the archives of the City of Aquila. It cites information about two families of Aquila with origins in the area of Paganica. The document records that "Antonio Bevilacqua transferred one noble knight to Roscio of Paganica de Aquila." At that time, a powerful noble family would award another noble family for loyalty with the gift of a knight. Antonio Bevilacqua gave Roscio of Paganica a knight for his loyalty against Charlemagne's French Carolingian empire in Italy which disintegrated completely in 987.

== 11th century ==
The Bevilacqua family expanded their power by remaining loyal to the descendants of Holy Roman Emperor Otto I. They solidified their position as one of the ruling families of Verona and Ferrara. The emperor had ceded Verona and Ferrara to the Duchy of Bavaria, and they granted land to the Bevilacqua family for their continued loyalty. In 1037, a legal document in Latin registers land in Verona and Cavedine near Trento to "Petrus Bibitaquam" which means Peter Bevilacqua in Latin.

=== Property in Ferrara and Corliano ===
In 1050, there is a deed for property written for lands in the City of Melegnano in Ferrara belonging to "Gregorius Bibitaquam" or Gregorius Bevilacqua. In 1056, Gregorius Bevilacqua acquired more property in Ferrara for his loyalty to King Henry III of Germany (King Otto's grandson). On May 7, 1059, the Principality of Bevilacqua was established located between Verona and Padua.

On May 25, 1060, the Duke and Marquess of Tuscany gave the Bevilacqua family additional property in an adjustment entitled In Comitatu Ariminensi in villa Corliano Bibens aquam. This property in Corliano was given to Bevilacqua for loyalty to Boniface of Canossa, Marquis of Tuscany.

=== Support of Countess Matilda ===
Count Viviano Bevilacqua was a major supporter of Countess Matilda of Tuscany, who campaigned for religious reform in Verona and in 1076 became the sole heiress to the wealthy Canossa estate. Count Viviano was a friend to Saint Giovanni Gualberto (985-1073) who founded the Vallumbrosan Order of Benedictines, and in 1073 the Count built the Church of San Giovanni de Gualberto (now called the Church of Holy Trinity) by the Vallumbrosan monastery on the Mount Olive Grove hill in Verona. In a deed dated July 3, 1098, Countess Matilda granted more property to the Bevilacqua family in the territory of Reggio for their assistance and protection.

== 12th century ==
=== The Guelphs and the Ghibellines ===
In 1142, the Guelphs of Padova attacked the Ghibellines of Verona to take over the city. Medieval historian, Ottone of Frisinga, wrote an account about "a battle of 1142 between the citizens of Verona and Padova which occurred west of the Bevilacqua castle, nearly in the river bed of the Fratta River." The Bevilacqua family led the Ghibellines of Verona and defeated the Guelph citizens of Padova led by the Carrara family.

=== Saint Peter's Church ===
The Bevilacqua family reconstructed and dedicated Saint Peter's Church in Cantalovo of Bevilacqua to celebrate their victory. The original church was built in the early 900's, and the reconstruction was begun in 1142 and completed in 1161. The reconstruction followed the technique of early Roman buildings and it is made of bricks baked in a kiln. Several frescoes decorate the inside walls of the church which are from the late 14th century.

Over the outside door of Saint Peter's Church, a barbaric inscription is carved on a white Verona marble block which says, "This is the ancient parochial church of Porto reconstructed in 1161 by the work of Balduino, under the rule of Emperor Frederic Barbarossa". Balduino was most probably Balduino della Scala (b. - 1169) who was the founder of the della Scala dynasty and rulers of Verona. The della Scala were well known in the area hence no title to his name was necessary. In the Archives of the Capitolare of Verona, a document is still preserved from 1159 granting additional "territory to Guglielmo Bevilacqua by King Frederic Barbarossa witnessed by Balduino for loyalty and service to the della Scala family, rulers of Verona."

=== Battle of Legnano ===
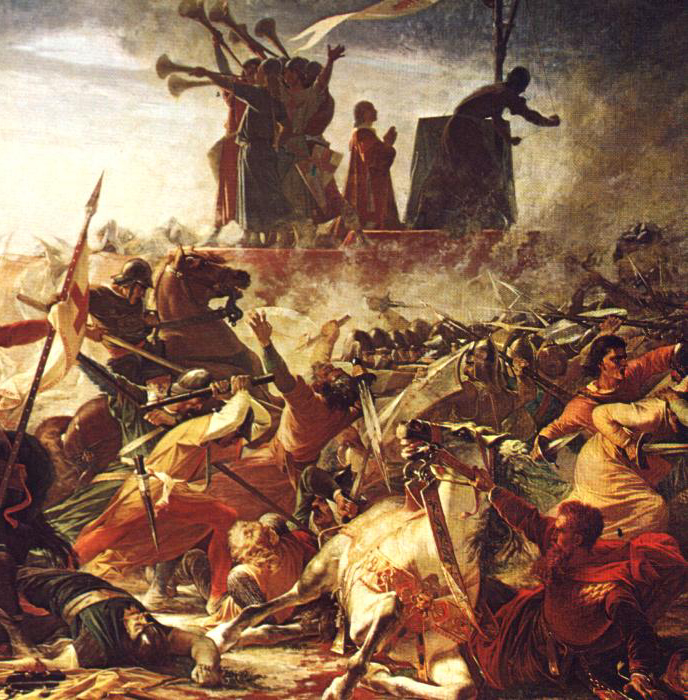
The defence of the Carroccio during the battle of Legnano (1176) by Amos Cassioli (1832–1891)

The Battle of Legnano (1176), in which the Lombard League defeated Frederick Barbarossa, took place adjacent to the Principality of Bevilacqua just outside Verona. In 1184, the Church of Saint Salvaro was given to Niccolo Bevilacqua by the Canossa family for their service and dedication against Barbarossa. Saint Salvaro of Niccolo of the Bevilacqua was situated in what was then called the county of Tarmassia which was a district of the city of Verona. An ancient document from 1184 was transcribed by Dr. G. B. Bertoli di Casaleone (October 21, 1895) that documents the transmittal of the church from the Canossa family to Niccolo Bevilacqua. In the northeast wall of the church, an engraved stone documents that the church was built by Contessa Matelda Canossa in 1118.

== See also ==
- Italian Wikipedia article

== Sources ==
- The Original Archives of the Bevilacqua and the Bevilacqua-Lazise families in the Archives of the Civic Museums in Verona, Bologna, Ferrara, and Aquilea.
- Frizzi, Antonio; Bodoni, Giambattista (1779). Memorie storiche della nobile famiglia Bevilacqua (in Italian). Parma: Dalla Reale Stamperia.
- Litta, Conte Pompeo (1852). Famiglie celebri italiane. Volume ottavo (in Italian). Milano: Tip. del dottore G. Ferrario.
- Pasini, F. Giuseppe Ferruccio (1888). Stemmi di un'illustre famiglia Ferrarese (Bevilacqua) /Conti Avogli-Trotti e Canestri-Trotti derivata dai medesimi (in Italian). Pisa: resso la Direzione del Giornale Araldico.
- Pope Clement VIII (1600). "Exemptiones, immunitates, & priuilegia concessa familiae Beuilaquae Ferrarien[sis], & Bononien" (in Latin). Rome: Paolo Blado.
- Seta, Valerio (1606). Compendio historico dell'origine, discendenza, attioni, et accasamenti della famiglia Bevilacqua (in Italian). Ferrara, Italy: Vittorio Baldini.
