= Sant'Elena, Veneto =

Sant'Elena
- Comune
- Comune di Sant'Elena
- Location within Italy Location within Veneto
- Coordinates: 45°11′N 11°43′E
- Country: Italy
- Region: Veneto
- Province: Province of Padua (PD)

Area
  - Total: 8.9 km^{2} (3.4 sq mi)

Population (Dec. 2004)
  - Total: 1,925
  - Density: 220/km^{2} (560/sq mi)
- Time zone: UTC+1 (CET)
  - Summer (DST): UTC+2 (CEST)
- Postal code: 35040
- Dialing code: 0429

Sant'Elena is a comune (municipality) in the Province of Padua in the Italian region Veneto, located about 50 kilometres (31 mi) southwest of Venice and about 30 kilometres (19 mi) southwest of Padua. As of 31 December 2004, it had a population of 1,925 and an area of 8.9 square kilometres (3.4 mi^{2}).

Sant'Elena borders the following municipalities: Este, Granze, Monselice, Solesino, Villa Estense.

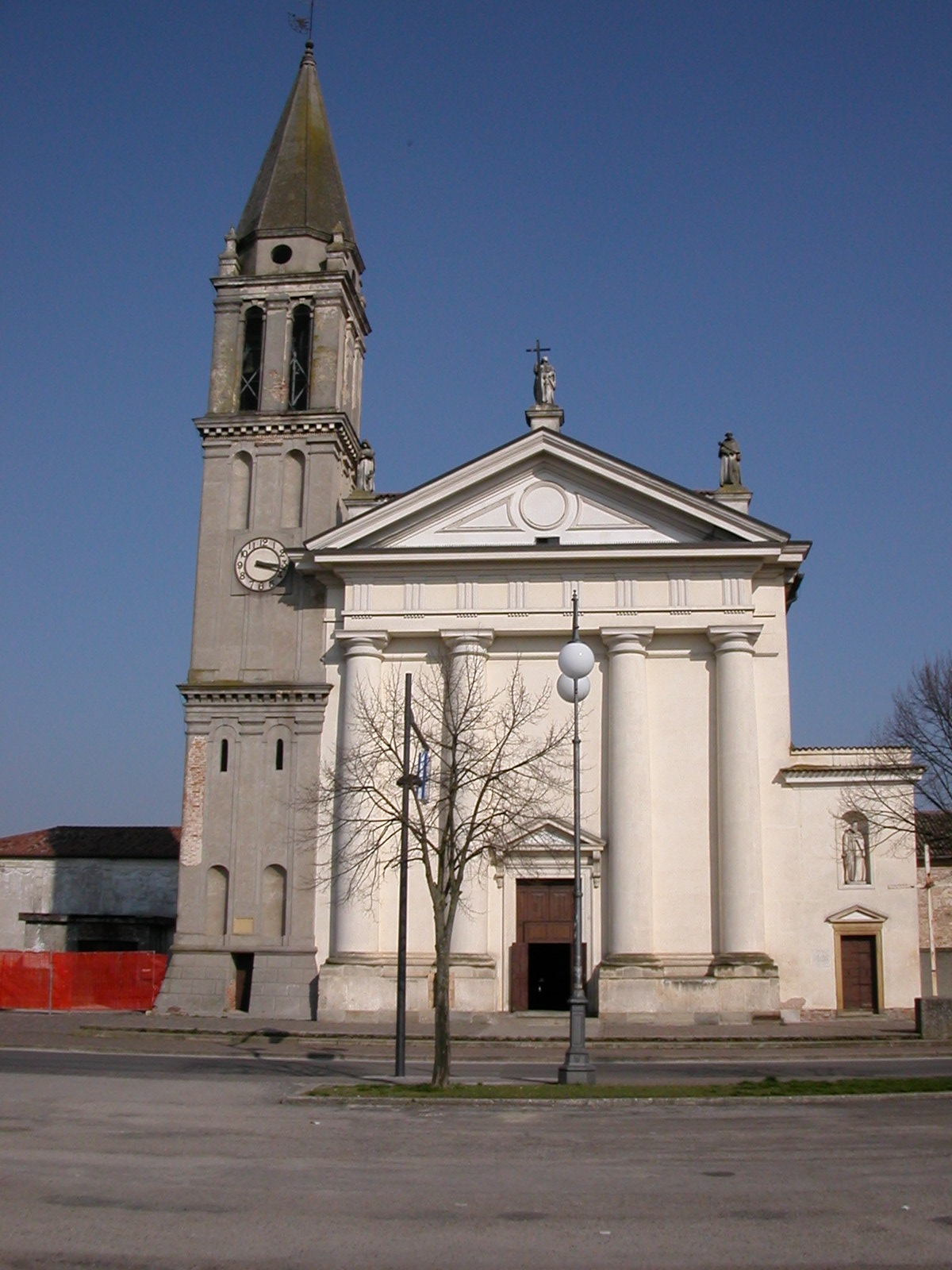

== Demographic evolution ==
Historical population

| Year | Pop. | ±% |
|---|---|---|
| 1861 | ? | — |
| 1871 | 1,391 | — |
| 1881 | 1,408 | +1.2% |
| 1901 | 1,508 | +7.1% |
| 1911 | 1,780 | +18.0% |

| Year | Pop. | ±% |
|---|---|---|
| 1921 | 2,050 | +15.2% |
| 1931 | 2,199 | +7.3% |
| 1936 | 2,295 | +4.4% |
| 1951 | 2,140 | −6.8% |
| 1961 | 1,681 | −21.4% |

| Year | Pop. | ±% |
|---|---|---|
| 1971 | 1,587 | −5.6% |
| 1981 | 1,606 | +1.2% |
| 1991 | 1,703 | +6.0% |
| 2001 | 1,764 | +3.6% |

Source: Data from ISTAT
