= Jardin, Isère =

Jardin
- Commune
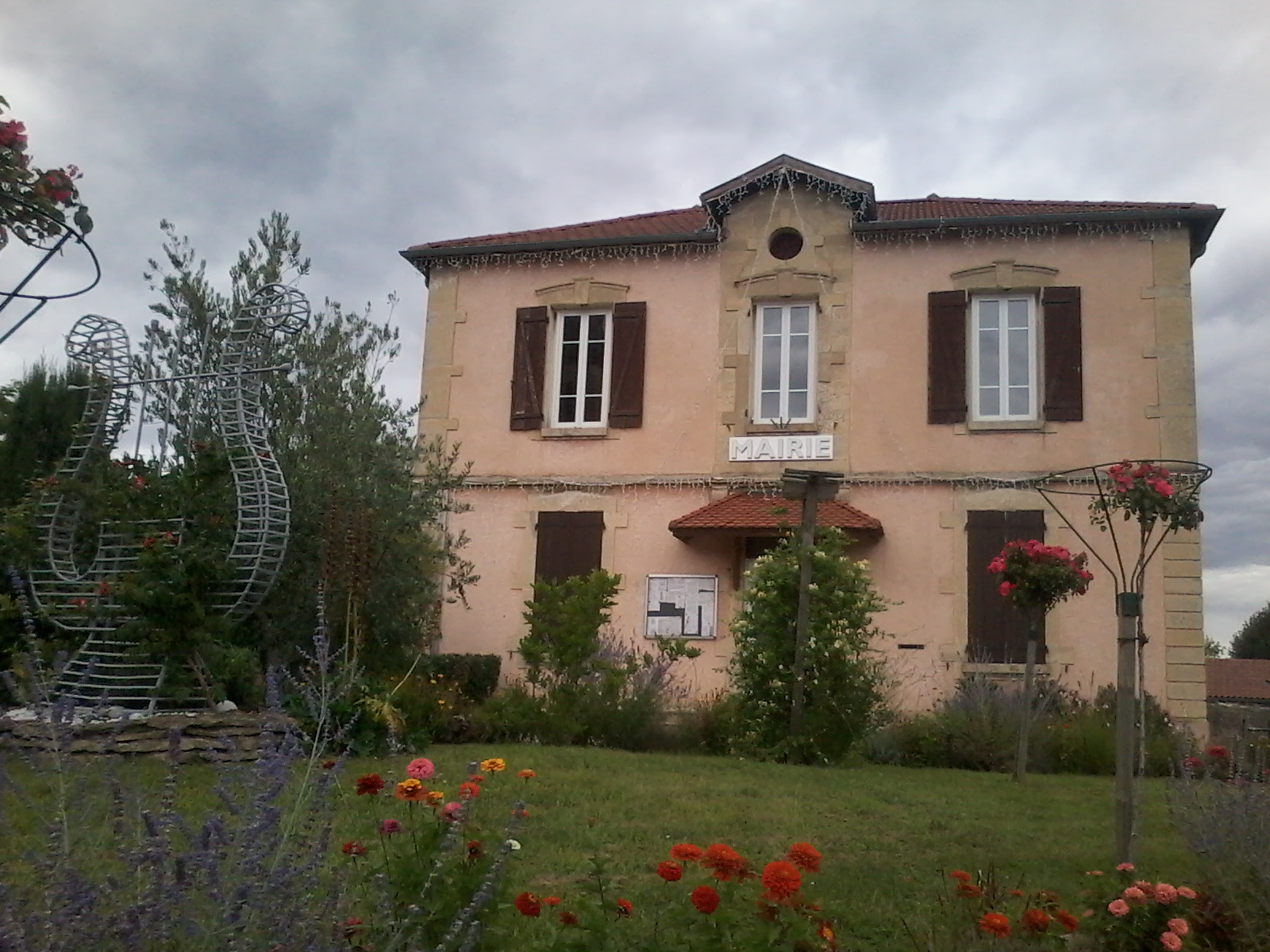
- The town hall of Jardin

- Coat of arms
- Location of Jardin
- Location within France Location within Auvergne-Rhône-Alpes
- Coordinates: 45°29′50″N 4°54′32″E
- Country: France
- Region: Auvergne-Rhône-Alpes
- Department: Isère
- Arrondissement: Vienne
- Canton: Vienne-2
- Intercommunality: CA Vienne Condrieu

Government
  - Mayor (2023–2026): Bernard Roqueplan
- Area^{1}: 9.25 km^{2} (3.57 sq mi)
- Elevation: 280 m (920 ft)
- Highest elevation: 407 m (1,335 ft)
- Lowest elevation: 194 m (636 ft)
- Population (2023): 2,178
  - Density: 235/km^{2} (610/sq mi)
- Time zone: UTC+01:00 (CET)
  - Summer (DST): UTC+02:00 (CEST)
- INSEE/Postal code: 38199 /38200
- ^{1} French Land Register data, which excludes lakes, ponds, glaciers > 1 km^{2} (0.386 sq mi or 247 acres) and river estuaries.

Jardin (French pronunciation: [ʒaʁdɛ̃]) is a commune in the Isère department in southeastern France. It is a suburb of Vienne. It is located 4 km from the centre of Vienne and 35 km south of Lyon.

== History ==
The name 'Jardin' is French for 'garden', reflecting the area's traditional history as a vegetable garden serving the town of Vienne and the manor of Montleans.

== Population ==
Historical population

| Year | Pop. | ±% p.a. |
|---|---|---|
| 1793 | 295 | — |
| 1800 | 263 | −1.63% |
| 1806 | 396 | +7.06% |
| 1821 | 457 | +0.96% |
| 1831 | 495 | +0.80% |
| 1836 | 493 | −0.08% |
| 1841 | 580 | +3.30% |
| 1846 | 592 | +0.41% |
| 1851 | 627 | +1.16% |
| 1856 | 620 | −0.22% |
| 1861 | 625 | +0.16% |
| 1866 | 609 | −0.52% |
| 1872 | 594 | −0.41% |
| 1876 | 567 | −1.16% |
| 1881 | 561 | −0.21% |
| 1886 | 540 | −0.76% |
| 1891 | 536 | −0.15% |
| 1896 | 487 | −1.90% |
| 1901 | 464 | −0.96% |

| Year | Pop. | ±% p.a. |
|---|---|---|
| 1906 | 465 | +0.04% |
| 1911 | 420 | −2.02% |
| 1921 | 387 | −0.81% |
| 1926 | 448 | +2.97% |
| 1931 | 457 | +0.40% |
| 1936 | 452 | −0.22% |
| 1946 | 405 | −1.09% |
| 1954 | 424 | +0.57% |
| 1962 | 449 | +0.72% |
| 1968 | 518 | +2.41% |
| 1975 | 786 | +6.14% |
| 1982 | 1,180 | +5.98% |
| 1990 | 1,527 | +3.27% |
| 1999 | 1,948 | +2.74% |
| 2007 | 2,162 | +1.31% |
| 2012 | 2,232 | +0.64% |
| 2017 | 2,207 | −0.23% |
| 2023 | 2,178 | −0.22% |

Source: EHESS and INSEE (1968-2023)

== Twin towns ==
Jardin is twinned with:

- Stanghella, Italy, since 2002

== See also ==
- Communes of the Isère department
