= Montagnana =

- Comune
- Comune di Montagnana
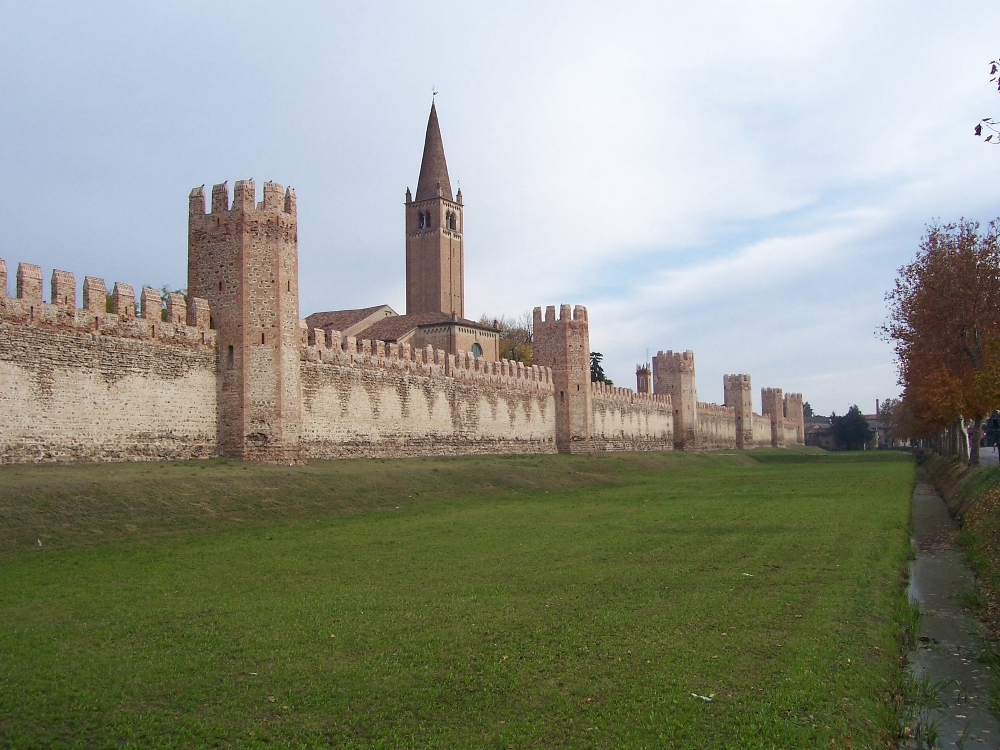
- The medieval city wall

- Coat of arms

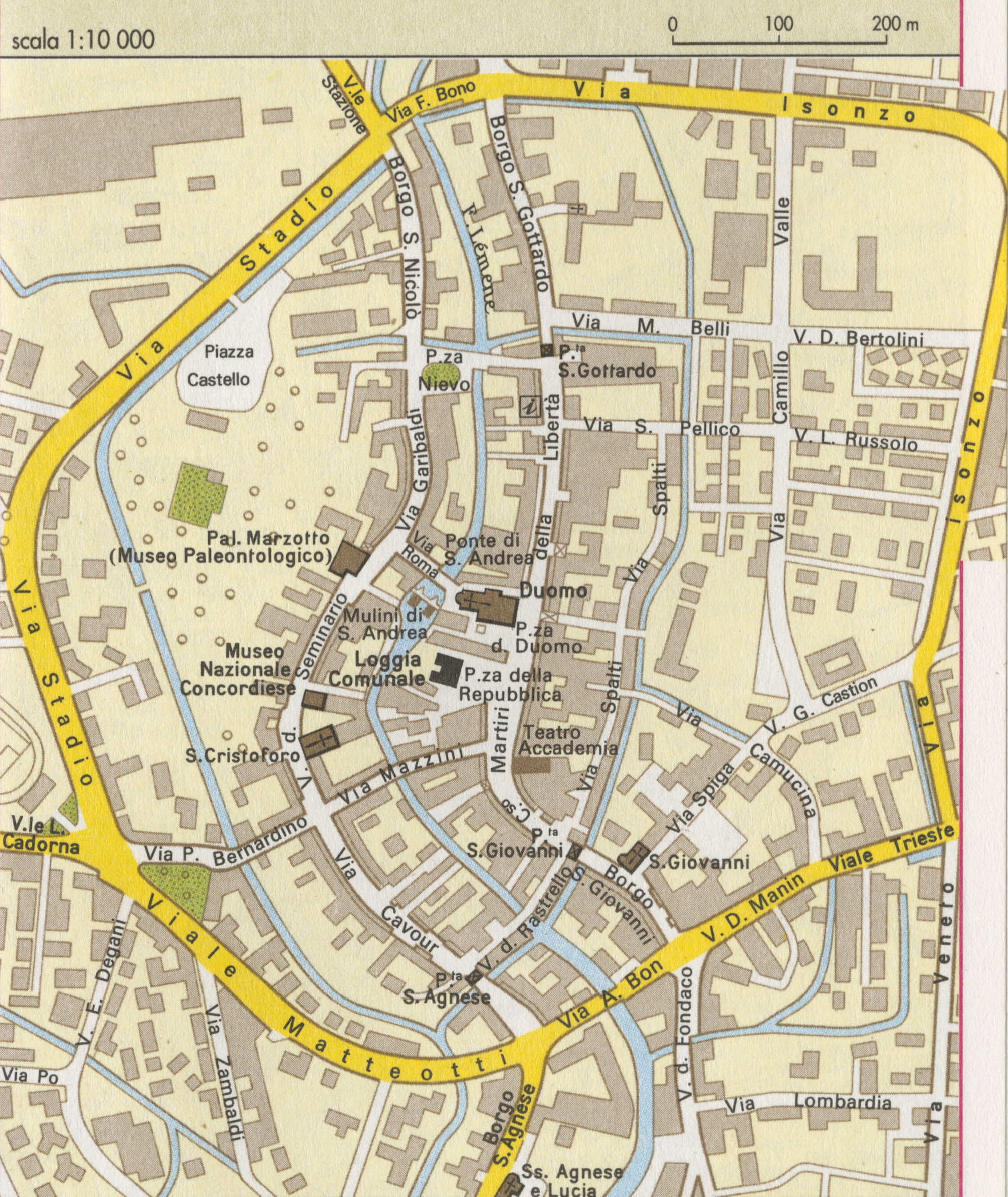

- Location within Italy Location within Veneto
- Coordinates: 45°14′00″N 11°27′40″E
- Country: Italy
- Region: Veneto
- Province: Padua (PD)
- Frazioni: Borgo San Marco, Borgo San Zeno, Borgo Frassine

Government
  - Mayor: Gian Paolo Lovato (Coalition)

Area
  - Total: 45 km^{2} (17 sq mi)
- Elevation: 16 m (52 ft)

Population (1 January 2017)
  - Total: 9,120
  - Density: 200/km^{2} (520/sq mi)
- Demonym: Montagnanesi
- Time zone: UTC+1 (CET)
  - Summer (DST): UTC+2 (CEST)
- Postal code: 35044
- Dialing code: 0429
- Patron saint: Assumption of Mary
- Saint day: 15 August
- Website: Official website

Montagnana (Italian pronunciation: [montaɲˈɲaːna]) is a town and comune in the province of Padua, in Veneto, northern Italy. Neighbouring communes are Borgo Veneto, Casale di Scodosia, Urbana, Bevilacqua, Pojana Maggiore, Pressana, Minerbe and Roveredo di Guà. As of 2017, the population of Montagnana is 9120. The town was awarded with the Bandiera arancione ("Orange Flag") and is one of I Borghi più belli d'Italia ("The Most Beautiful Villages of Italy").

== Main sights ==
- City walls: one of the best preserved examples of medieval walls in Europe.
- Castle of San Zeno: built by Ezzelino III da Romano. Another castle is the Rocca degli Alberi, built by the Carraresi family in 1360–62.
- Santa Maria Assunta: Gothic Cathedral (1431–1502), with late-Renaissance additions. The interior includes a Transfiguration by Paolo Veronese and fresco of Judith and David, recently attributed to Giorgione.
- Palazzo Magnavin-Foratti, in Gothic-Venetian style.
- Town Hall (1532).

Outside the city is the Villa Pisani, one of Andrea Palladio's masterpieces. The nearby town of Cittadella in the same province is also a walled town.

== Ancient walls ==
The ancient walls that surrounds Montagnana were built in the eleventh century to protect the town. It is a 2 km long wall with a height that varies between 6.5 and 8 meters. The current walls, which represent one of the most distinguished and best preserved examples of medieval military architecture in Europe, except the complex of Castel San Zeno and the parts of the walls to the east and west that are older, date back to the middle of the 14th century, when the Carraresi, lords of Padua, wanted to enlarge and strengthen this essential frontier fort of the Paduan state against the Verona of the Scaligeri, which dominated the nearby Legnago. The urban space intramoenia was expanded on that occasion, and the new enclosure was built with superimposed layers of bricks and stones (trachyte transported by water from the nearby Euganean hills). The fortified city is enclosed in an irregular quadrilateral of about 600x300 metres with an area of 24 hectares and a perimeter of about two kilometres. The walls, crowned by Guelph-type battlements, are 6.5 to 8 metres high, with a thickness of 96–100 cm. Between one battlement and another, wooden fans served to shelter the defenders. The perimeter towers, a total of 24, spaced of about 60 meters, are between 17 and 19 metres high. The external valley varies from 30 to 40 metres.

The warehouses (canipe) were located inside the barrel-vaults that support the patrol path, in order to keep the goods produced in the countryside (we can still see the grooves to attach the wooden reinforcements). In the towers, with several floors and covered by a sloping roof hidden under the pitch equipped with siege engines, there were other warehouses and quarters for soldiers placed as a garrison of the fortress in times of war emergency. An area without buildings and used as a cultivated pomerium to face long sieges was all around the walls from the inside.

Around the walls ran a large moat (the current picturesque and green Vallo) flooded with the water of the river Frassine (border towards the Vicenza area) derived by means of a canal with raised embankments (the Fiumicello) as a defensive canal along which, on the Paduan side, there was an elevated outpost for the buildup of troops. All around the Montagnana area there were impassable swamps or floodable plains in case of war, so that the walled city was the key to the Paduan frontier to the west. The military structure was also encircled by four advanced perimeter fortifications (the bastions), now disappeared, and the two fortresses placed to defend the two gates were surrounded by a moat on the city side as well. The fortress, in its time, was impregnable and, in fact, until the advent of howitzers (16th century), it was never captured militarily.

Access to the city was controlled by the fortified gates of the castle of San Zeno (to the east, towards Padua) and the Rocca degli Alberi (to the west, towards the Veronese area). Only later, in the 16th century, a third door (Porta Nova or Porta di Vicenza) was opened in the north to facilitate communication with the river port of Frassine. At the end of the 19th century a fourth passage was made towards the south, for access to the railway station (Porta XX Settembre).

The medieval walls of Montagnana have been included among the I Luoghi del Cuore, an initiative promoted by the FAI.

== Rocca degli Alberi ==
The Rocca degli Alberi, which stands imposing and scenic on the valley from the west, was built by the Carraresi family in the biennium 1360–62 with exclusively military function. The fortified entrance consisted of a complex defensive system: along the entrance hall, dominated by two towers, there were four swing doors, two shutters and four drawbridges. A similar system was in Castel San Zeno.

Since 1963 the fortress contained the youth hostel, now moved to a structure a few meters outside the walls, and it can be visited in the period April–October.

== Castle of San Zeno ==
The castle of San Zeno (whose name derives from the nearby San Zeno church, recalls a phase of expansion of the veronese diocese) stands in the place of a high-medieval settlement that was the residence of the heirs of Hugh the Great of Tuscany who later became the marquises of Este. Today's construction (except for the Venetian room and the Austrian superstructures) dates back to the 13th century, when Ezzelino III da Romano, after having set it on fire in 1242, wanted to fortify Montagnana better.

The building has a rectangular plan (46x26 metres) with a large internal courtyard. Until the early 19th century, the castle was surrounded by a moat that also isolated it from the city side. The structure was completed by towers (of which two remain) and the nearby lookout tower (about 40 metres high) which had to be a privileged point for sighting and defense of the city. Initially, the drawbridge that crossed the valley allowing access to the city, probably led to the inner courtyard of the castle. It is assumed that the passage was then moved to the south side of the castle itself, protected by both this and the high lookout tower. The latter was originally supposed to be lower and covered by a wooden roof surmounted by a guardhouse.

== Palio dei 10 Comuni ==
The Palio dei 10 Comuni del Montagnanese, commonly called "Palio di Montagnana" because it takes place in the town of Montagnana, is a commemorating event in memory of the liberation from the tragic tyranny of Ezzelino III da Romano. Since 1977 it is held annually on the first Sunday of September renewing an ancient medieval tradition. The race includes two qualifiers and a final, on horses rode bareback by jockeys. The Oath of the Captains is the event that starts the Palio and until 2018 was held about a week before but in 2019 was held on the Thursday before the Palio Race. In conjunction with the race, Montagnana is immersed in the medieval atmosphere with several activities: the Historical Parade through the city streets, the Tenzone (a competition) of archers, musicians and flag wavers, the Gonfalons race in addition to the suggestive Burning of the Fortress that is generally held the night before the race.

== Culture ==
Two of the 20th century's greatest operatic tenors, Giovanni Martinelli and Aureliano Pertile, were both born in the town in 1885.

== Food and cuisine ==
Montagnana is famous for its prosciutto. In mid May, the city organises a festival with conferences and tastings that attracts thousands of visitors.
