= Stanghella =

- Comune
- Comune di Stanghella
- Location within Italy Location within Veneto
- Coordinates: 45°8′N 11°45′E
- Country: Italy
- Region: Veneto
- Province: Province of Padua (PD)

Area
  - Total: 19.7 km^{2} (7.6 sq mi)

Population (Dec. 2004)
  - Total: 4,474
  - Density: 227/km^{2} (588/sq mi)
- Time zone: UTC+1 (CET)
  - Summer (DST): UTC+2 (CEST)
- Postal code: 35048
- Dialing code: 0425

Stanghella is a comune (municipality) in the Province of Padua in the Italian region Veneto, located about 60 kilometres (37 mi) southwest of Venice and about 35 kilometres (22 mi) southwest of Padua. As of 31 December 2004, it had a population of 4,474 and an area of 19.7 square kilometres (7.6 mi^{2}).

Stanghella borders the following municipalities: Boara Pisani, Granze, Pozzonovo, Solesino, Vescovana.

== Demographic evolution ==
Historical population

Year	Pop.	±%
1861	?	—
1871	3,515	—
1881	3,521	+0.2%
1901	3,458	−1.8%
1911	4,242	+22.7%

Year	Pop.	±%
1921	4,738	+11.7%
1931	5,118	+8.0%
1936	5,444	+6.4%
1951	5,485	+0.8%
1961	4,434	−19.2%

Year	Pop.	±%
1971	4,458	+0.5%
1981	4,609	+3.4%
1991	4,580	−0.6%
2001	4,458	−2.7%

Source: Data from ISTAT

== Twin towns ==
Stanghella is twinned with:

- Jardin, Isère, France, since 2002
