= Villa Estense =

- Comune
- Comune di Villa Estense
- Location within Italy Location within Veneto
- Coordinates: 45°10′N 11°40′E
- Country: Italy
- Region: Veneto
- Province: Province of Padua (PD)

Area
  - Total: 16.0 km^{2} (6.2 sq mi)

Population (Dec. 2004)
  - Total: 2,407
  - Density: 150/km^{2} (390/sq mi)
- Time zone: UTC+1 (CET)
  - Summer (DST): UTC+2 (CEST)
- Postal code: 35040
- Dialing code: 0429

Villa Estense is a comune (municipality) in the Province of Padua in the Italian region Veneto, located about 60 kilometres (37 mi) southwest of Venice and about 30 kilometres (19 mi) southwest of Padua. As of 31 December 2004, it had a population of 2,407 and an area of 16.0 square kilometres (6.2 mi^{2}).

Villa Estense borders the following municipalities: Este, Granze, Sant'Elena, Sant'Urbano, Vescovana, Vighizzolo d'Este.

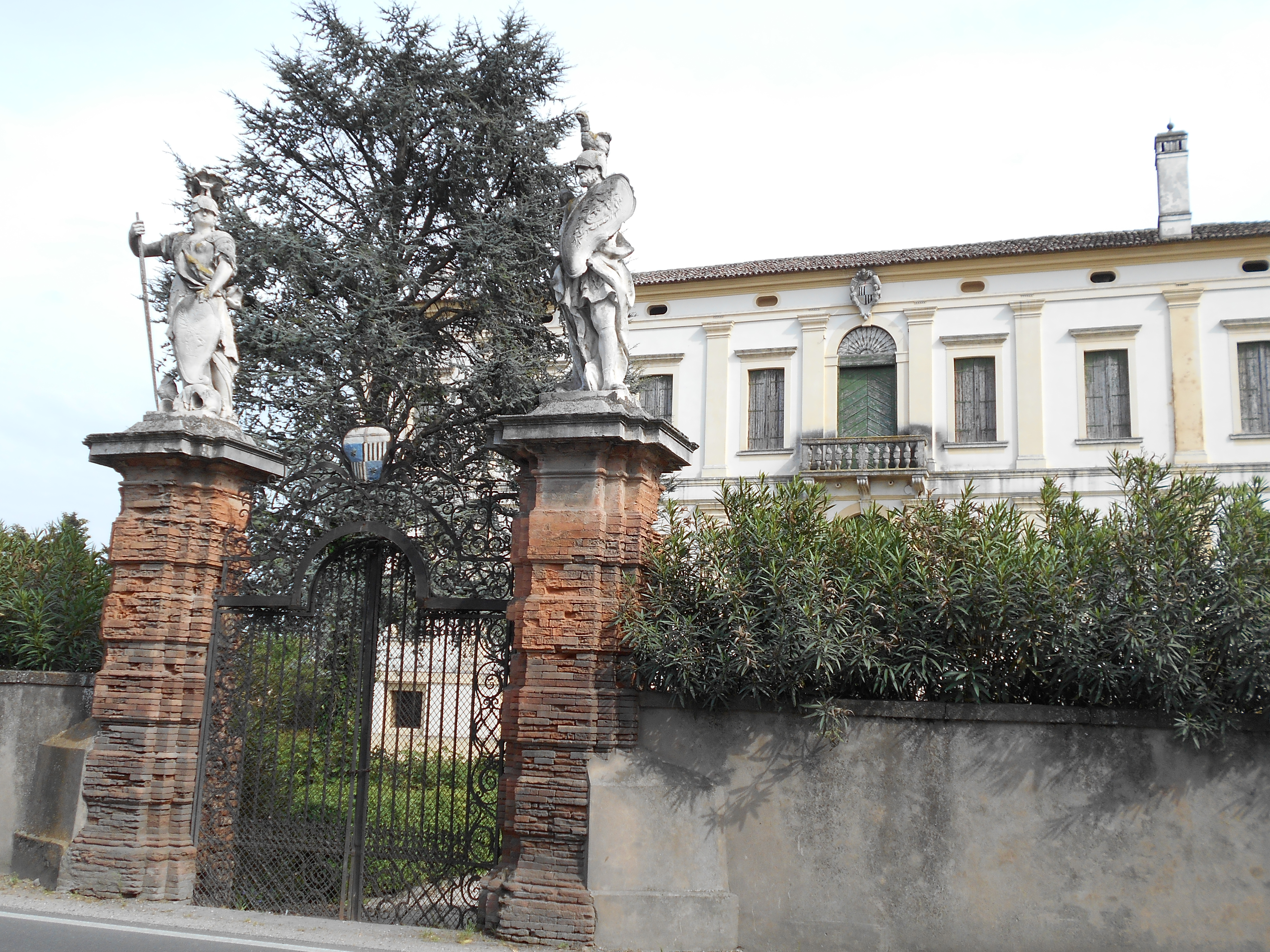
Palazzo San Bonifacio

== Demographic evolution ==
Historical population

Year	Pop.	±%
1861	?	—
1871	2,534	—
1881	2,851	+12.5%
1901	2,531	−11.2%
1911	3,114	+23.0%

Year	Pop.	±%
1921	3,543	+13.8%
1931	3,934	+11.0%
1936	3,936	+0.1%
1951	3,741	−5.0%
1961	2,917	−22.0%

Year	Pop.	±%
1971	2,660	−8.8%
1981	2,558	−3.8%
1991	2,386	−6.7%
2001	2,423	+1.6%

Source: Data from ISTAT
