= Solesino =

- Comune
- Comune di Solesino
- Location within Italy Location within Veneto
- Coordinates: 45°10′N 11°45′E
- Country: Italy
- Region: Veneto
- Province: Province of Padua (PD)

Area
  - Total: 10.3 km^{2} (4.0 sq mi)

Population (Dec. 2004)
  - Total: 7,068
  - Density: 686/km^{2} (1,780/sq mi)
- Time zone: UTC+1 (CET)
  - Summer (DST): UTC+2 (CEST)
- Postal code: 35047
- Dialing code: 0429

Solesino is a comune (municipality) in the Province of Padua in the Italian region Veneto, located about 50 kilometres (31 mi) southwest of Venice and about 30 kilometres (19 mi) southwest of Padua. As of 31 December 2004, it had a population of 7,068 and an area of 10.3 square kilometres (4.0 mi^{2}).

Solesino borders the following municipalities: Granze, Monselice, Pozzonovo, Sant'Elena, Stanghella.

== Demographic evolution ==
Historical population

Year	Pop.	±%
1861	?	—
1871	2,507	—
1881	2,655	+5.9%
1901	2,973	+12.0%
1911	3,706	+24.7%

Year	Pop.	±%
1921	4,322	+16.6%
1931	5,088	+17.7%
1936	5,429	+6.7%
1951	6,085	+12.1%
1961	6,079	−0.1%

Year	Pop.	±%
1971	6,830	+12.4%
1981	7,144	+4.6%
1991	7,022	−1.7%
2001	7,071	+0.7%

Source: Data from ISTAT
