= Megliadino San Vitale =

- Comune
- Comune di Megliadino San Vitale
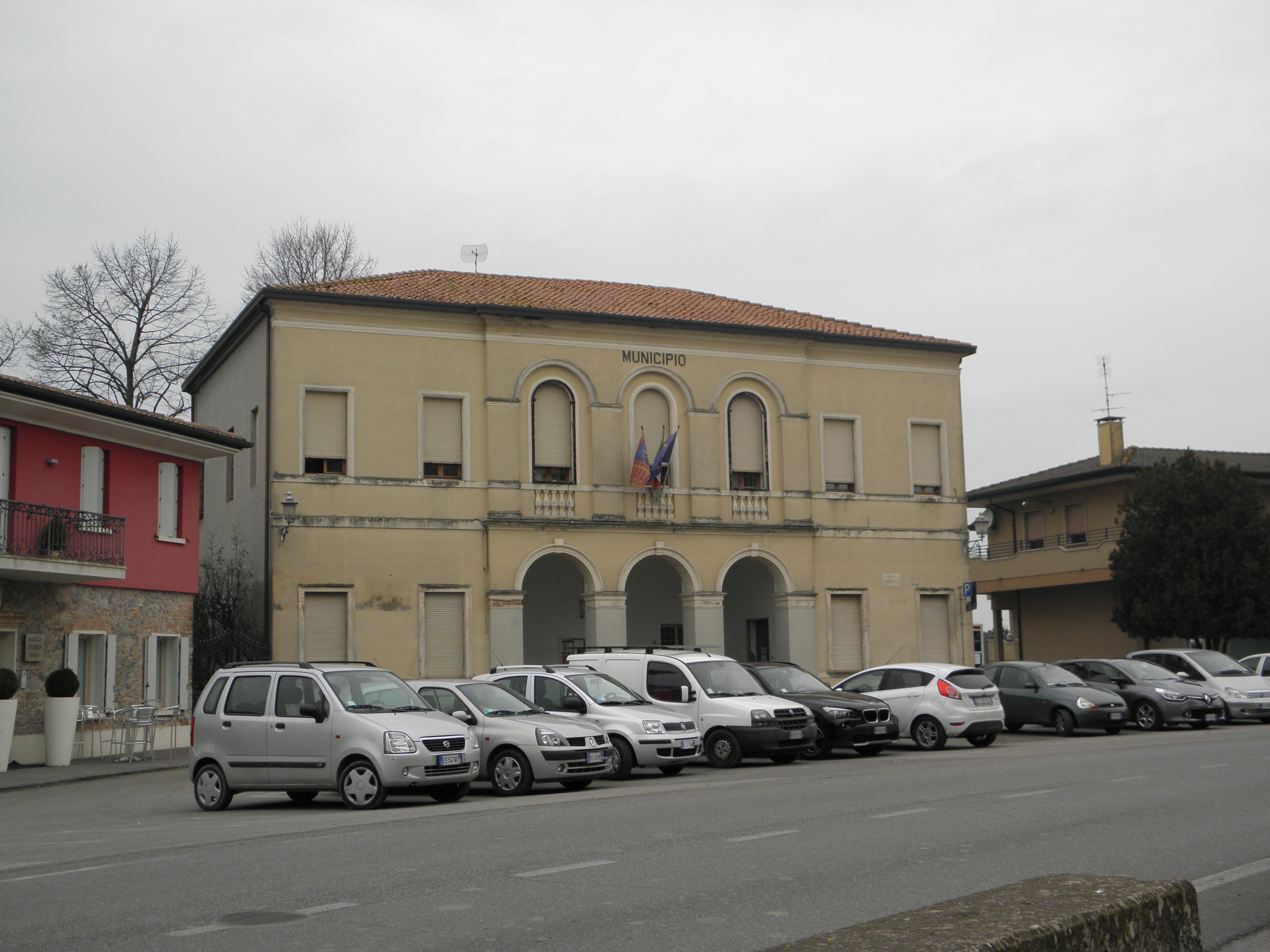
- Town hall.

- Location within Italy Location within Veneto
- Coordinates: 45°11′N 11°32′E
- Country: Italy
- Region: Veneto
- Province: Padua (PD)

Government
  - Mayor: Antonello Roccoberton

Area
  - Total: 15.1 km^{2} (5.8 sq mi)
- Elevation: 12 m (39 ft)

Population (31 December 2015)
  - Total: 1,959
  - Density: 130/km^{2} (336/sq mi)
- Demonym: Sanvitalesi
- Time zone: UTC+1 (CET)
  - Summer (DST): UTC+2 (CEST)
- Postal code: 35040
- Dialing code: 0429
- Website: Official website

Megliadino San Vitale is a comune (municipality) in the Province of Padua in the Italian region Veneto, located about 70 kilometres (43 mi) southwest of Venice and about 35 kilometres (22 mi) southwest of Padua.

Megliadino San Vitale borders the following municipalities: Casale di Scodosia, Megliadino San Fidenzio, Piacenza d'Adige, Santa Margherita d'Adige.
