= Vescovana =

- Comune
- Comune di Vescovana
- Location within Italy Location within Veneto
- Coordinates: 45°8′N 11°43′E
- Country: Italy
- Region: Veneto
- Province: Province of Padua (PD)

Area
  - Total: 22.3 km^{2} (8.6 sq mi)
- Elevation: 7 m (23 ft)

Population (Dec. 2004)
  - Total: 1,601
  - Density: 71.8/km^{2} (186/sq mi)
- Time zone: UTC+1 (CET)
  - Summer (DST): UTC+2 (CEST)
- Postal code: 35040
- Dialing code: 0425
- Website: Official website

Vescovana is a comune (municipality) in the Province of Padua in the Italian region Veneto, located about 60 kilometres (37 mi) southwest of Venice and about 35 kilometres (22 mi) southwest of Padua. As of 31 December 2004, it had a population of 1,601 and an area of 22.3 square kilometres (8.6 mi^{2}).

Vescovana borders the following municipalities: Barbona, Boara Pisani, Granze, Rovigo, Sant'Urbano, Stanghella, Villa Estense.

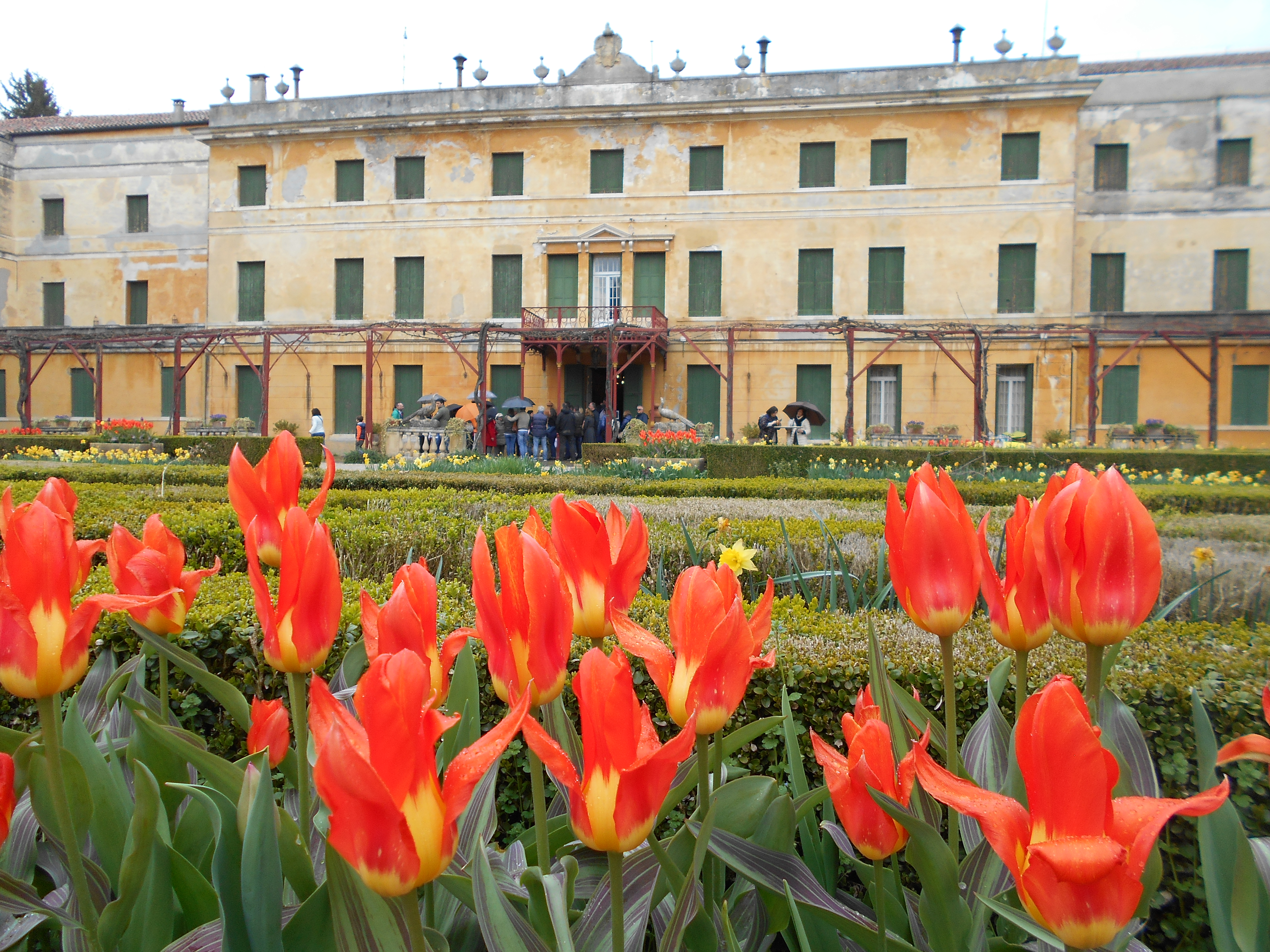
Villa Pisani, Vescovana, Padua

== Demographic evolution ==
Historical population

Year	Pop.	±%
1861	?	—
1871	2,206	—
1881	2,215	+0.4%
1901	2,156	−2.7%
1911	2,568	+19.1%

Year	Pop.	±%
1921	2,712	+5.6%
1931	2,646	−2.4%
1936	2,706	+2.3%
1951	2,794	+3.3%
1961	2,034	−27.2%

Year	Pop.	±%
1971	1,697	−16.6%
1981	1,574	−7.2%
1991	1,583	+0.6%
2001	1,568	−0.9%

Source: Data from ISTAT
