= Santa Margherita d'Adige =

- Comune
- Comune di Santa Margherita d'adige
- Location within Italy Location within Veneto
- Coordinates: 45°13′N 11°33′E
- Country: Italy
- Region: Veneto
- Province: Province of Padua (PD)

Area
  - Total: 12.7 km^{2} (4.9 sq mi)

Population (Dec. 2004)
  - Total: 2,308
  - Density: 182/km^{2} (471/sq mi)
- Time zone: UTC+1 (CET)
  - Summer (DST): UTC+2 (CEST)
- Postal code: 35040
- Dialing code: 0429

Santa Margherita d'Adige was a comune (municipality) in the Province of Padua in the Italian region Veneto, located about 60 kilometres (37 mi) southwest of Venice and about 35 kilometres (22 mi) southwest of Padua. As of 31 December 2004, it had a population of 2,308 and an area of 12.7 square kilometres (4.9 mi^{2}).

Santa Margherita d'Adige bordered the following former and current municipalities: Megliadino San Fidenzio (former), Megliadino San Vitale, Ospedaletto Euganeo, Piacenza d'Adige, Ponso, Saletto (former).

Since 17 February 2018 Santa Margherita d'Adige is part of Borgo Veneto municipality.

== Demographic evolution ==
Historical population

Year	Pop.	±%
1861	?	—
1871	2,433	—
1881	2,583	+6.2%
1901	2,629	+1.8%
1911	3,089	+17.5%

Year	Pop.	±%
1921	3,345	+8.3%
1931	3,435	+2.7%
1936	3,349	−2.5%
1951	3,213	−4.1%
1961	2,440	−24.1%

Year	Pop.	±%
1971	2,291	−6.1%
1981	2,191	−4.4%
1991	2,090	−4.6%
2001	2,243	+7.3%

Source: Data from ISTAT
