= Sant'Urbano =

Sant'Urbano Sant’Urban
- Comune
- Comune di Sant'Urbano
- Location within Italy Location within Veneto
- Coordinates: 45°8′N 11°39′E
- Country: Italy
- Region: Veneto
- Province: Province of Padova (PD)
- Frazioni: Carmignano, Ca' Morosini, Balduina

Area
  - Total: 31.8 km^{2} (12.3 sq mi)

Population (Dec. 2004)
  - Total: 2,189
  - Density: 68.8/km^{2} (178/sq mi)
- Time zone: UTC+1 (CET)
  - Summer (DST): UTC+2 (CEST)
- Postal code: 35040
- Dialing code: 0429

Sant'Urbano (Venetian: Sant’Urban) is a comune (municipality) in the Province of Padua in the Italian region Veneto, located about 60 kilometres (37 mi) southwest of Venice and about 35 kilometres (22 mi) southwest of Padua. As of 31 December 2004, it had a population of 2,189 and an area of 31.8 square kilometres (12.3 mi^{2}).

The municipality of Sant'Urbano contains the frazioni (subdivisions, mainly villages and hamlets) Carmignano, Ca' Morosini, and Balduina.

Sant'Urbano borders the following municipalities: Barbona, Granze, Lendinara, Lusia, Piacenza d'Adige, Vescovana, Vighizzolo d'Este, Villa Estense.

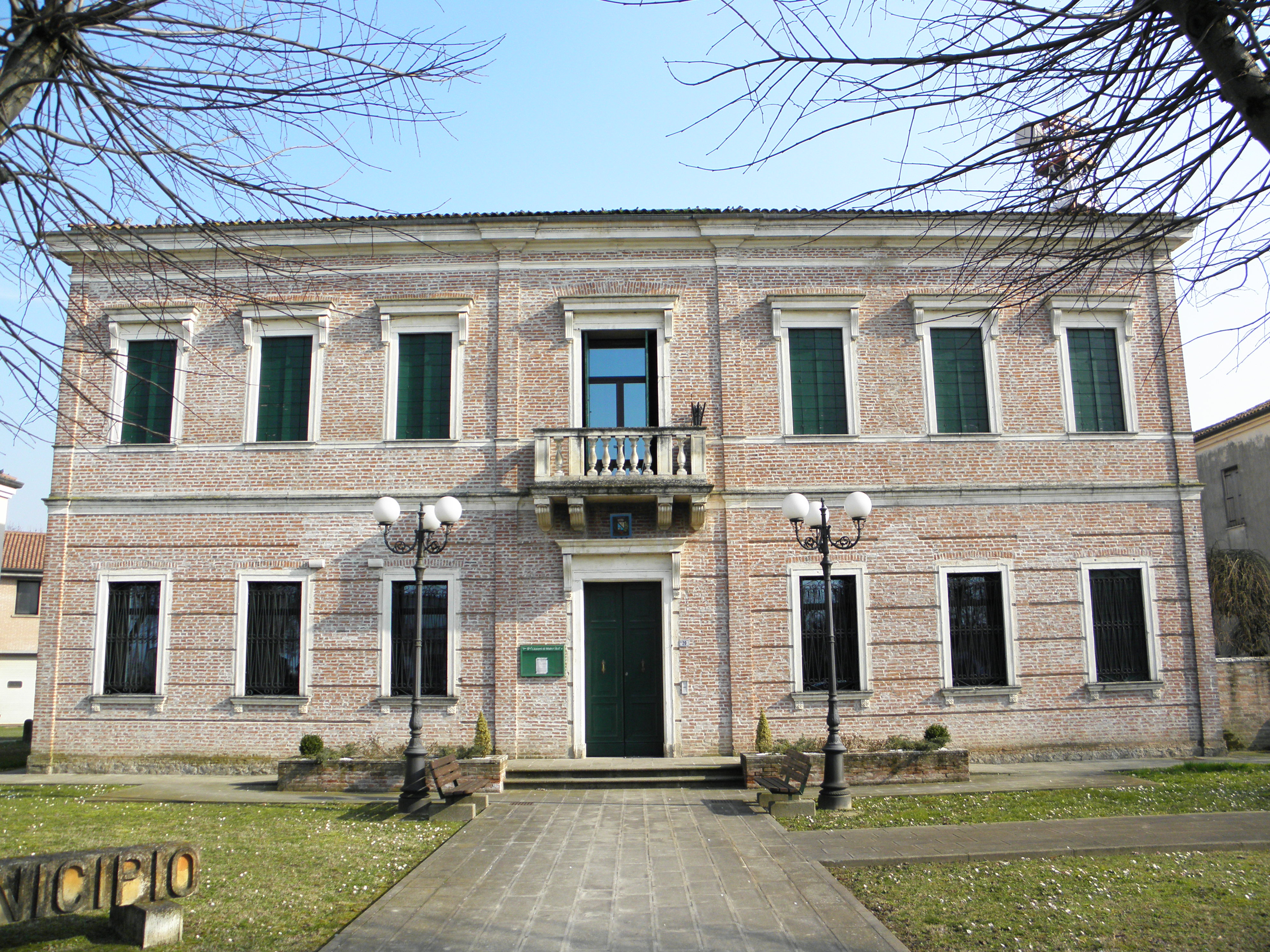
Ca' Morosini, Town hall of Sant'Urbano municipality

== Demographic evolution ==
Historical population

Year	Pop.	±%
1861	?	—
1871	3,367	—
1881	3,526	+4.7%
1901	3,424	−2.9%
1911	3,851	+12.5%

Year	Pop.	±%
1921	4,372	+13.5%
1931	4,939	+13.0%
1936	5,057	+2.4%
1951	4,629	−8.5%
1961	3,293	−28.9%

Year	Pop.	±%
1971	2,781	−15.5%
1981	2,614	−6.0%
1991	2,454	−6.1%
2001	2,253	−8.2%

Source: Data from ISTAT
