= Borgo Veneto =

- Comune
- Comune di Borgo Veneto
- Location within Italy Location within Veneto
- Coordinates: 45°13′44.79″N 11°32′18.33″E
- Country: Italy
- Region: Veneto
- Province: Padua (PD)
- Frazioni: Dossi, Megliadino San Fidenzio, Prà di Botte, Saletto, Santa Margherita d'Adige, Taglie

Government
  - Mayor: Michele Sigolotto

Area
  - Total: 39.171 km^{2} (15.124 sq mi)

Population (31 December 2017)
  - Total: 7,000
  - Density: 180/km^{2} (460/sq mi)
- Time zone: UTC+1 (CET)
  - Summer (DST): UTC+2 (CEST)
- Postal code: 35040-35046
- Dialing code: 0429
- Website: Official website

Borgo Veneto is a comune (municipality) in the Province of Padua in the Italian region Veneto.

It was established on 17 February 2018 by the merger of former municipalities of Megliadino San Fidenzio, Saletto and Santa Margherita d'Adige.

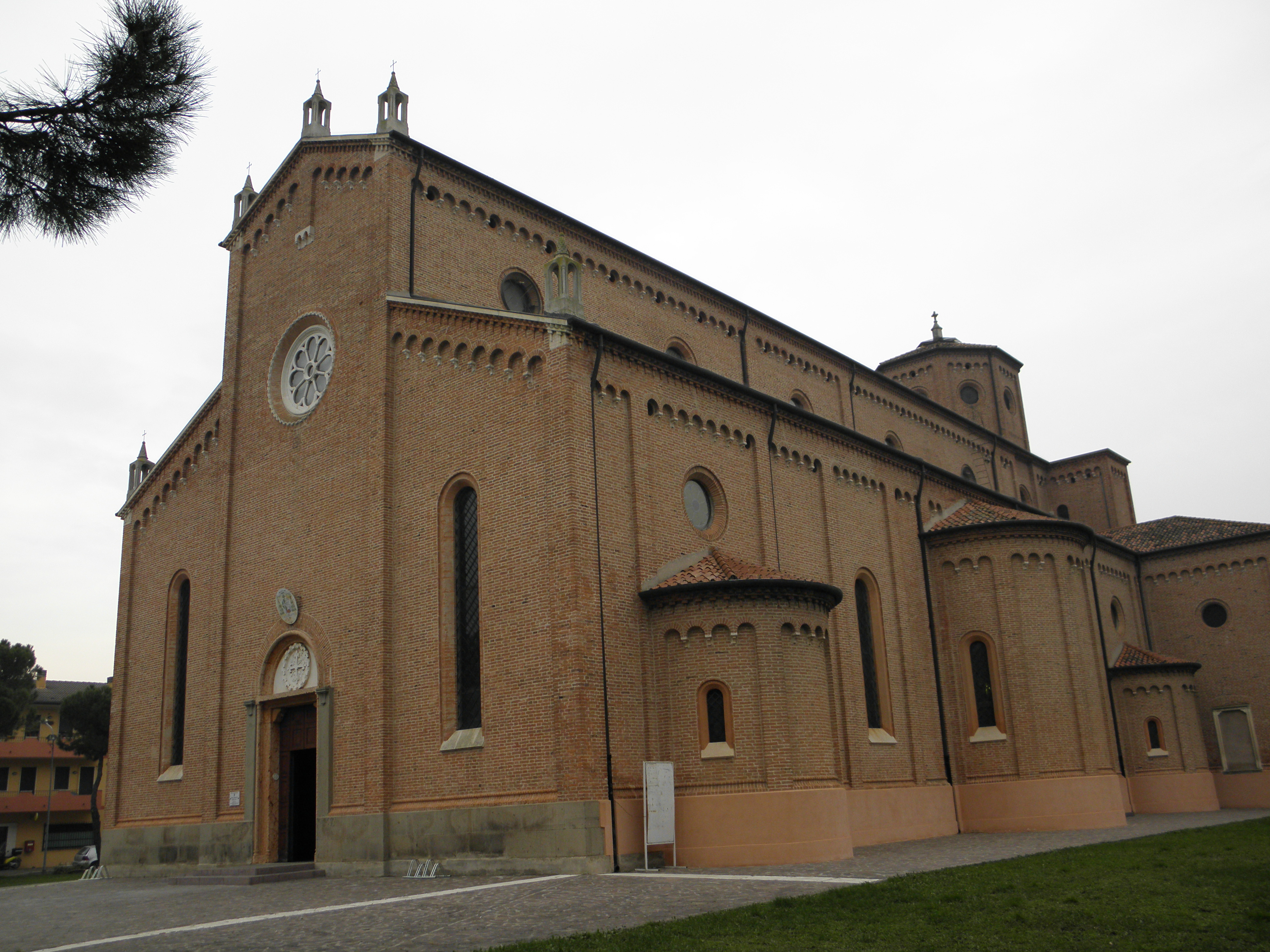
