= Urbana, Veneto =

Urbana
- Comune
- Comune di Urbana
- Location within Italy Location within Veneto
- Coordinates: 45°11′N 11°27′E
- Country: Italy
- Region: Veneto
- Province: Padua (PD)
- Frazioni: San Salvaro

Area
  - Total: 17 km^{2} (6.6 sq mi)

Population (2011)
  - Total: 2,191
  - Density: 130/km^{2} (330/sq mi)
- Time zone: UTC+1 (CET)
  - Summer (DST): UTC+2 (CEST)
- Postal code: 35040
- Dialing code: 0429

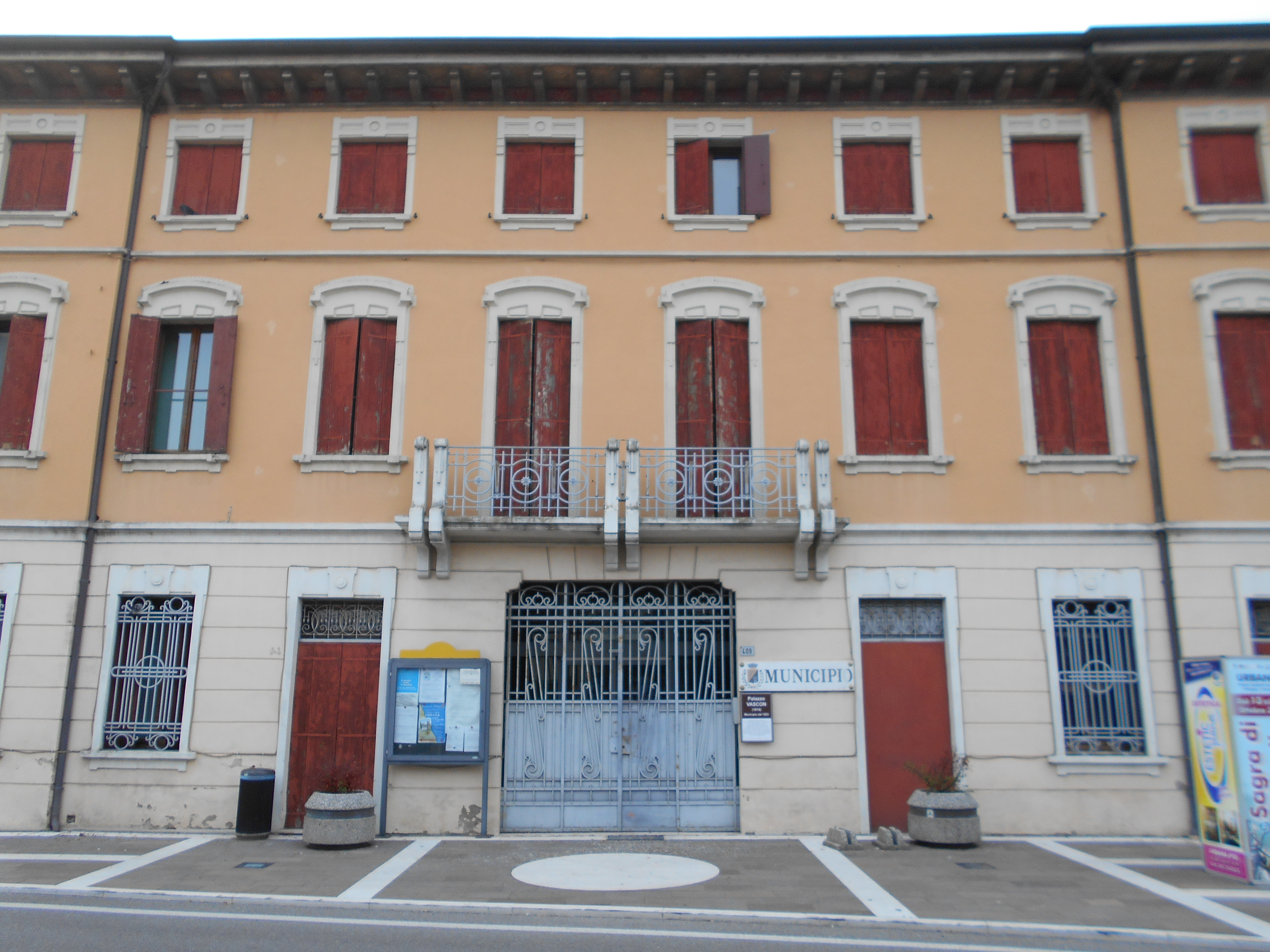
Town hall in Urbana, Veneto

Urbana is a comune in the province of Padua, in Veneto region of northern Italy with a population of 2,146 as of 2017.
